= Anglo-Saxon brooches =

Decorative 5th–11th century clothing fasteners

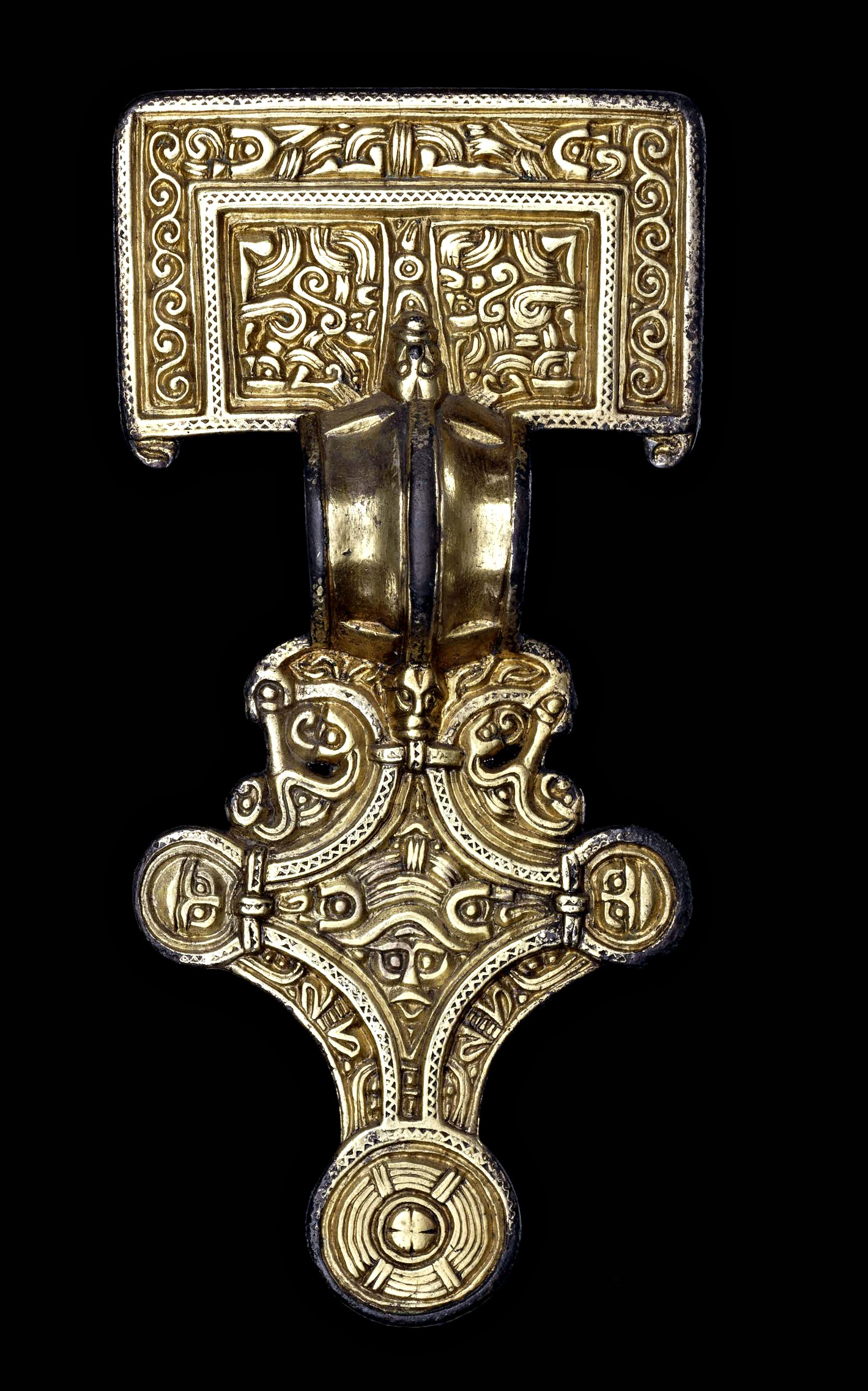
Great square-headed brooch, 6th century

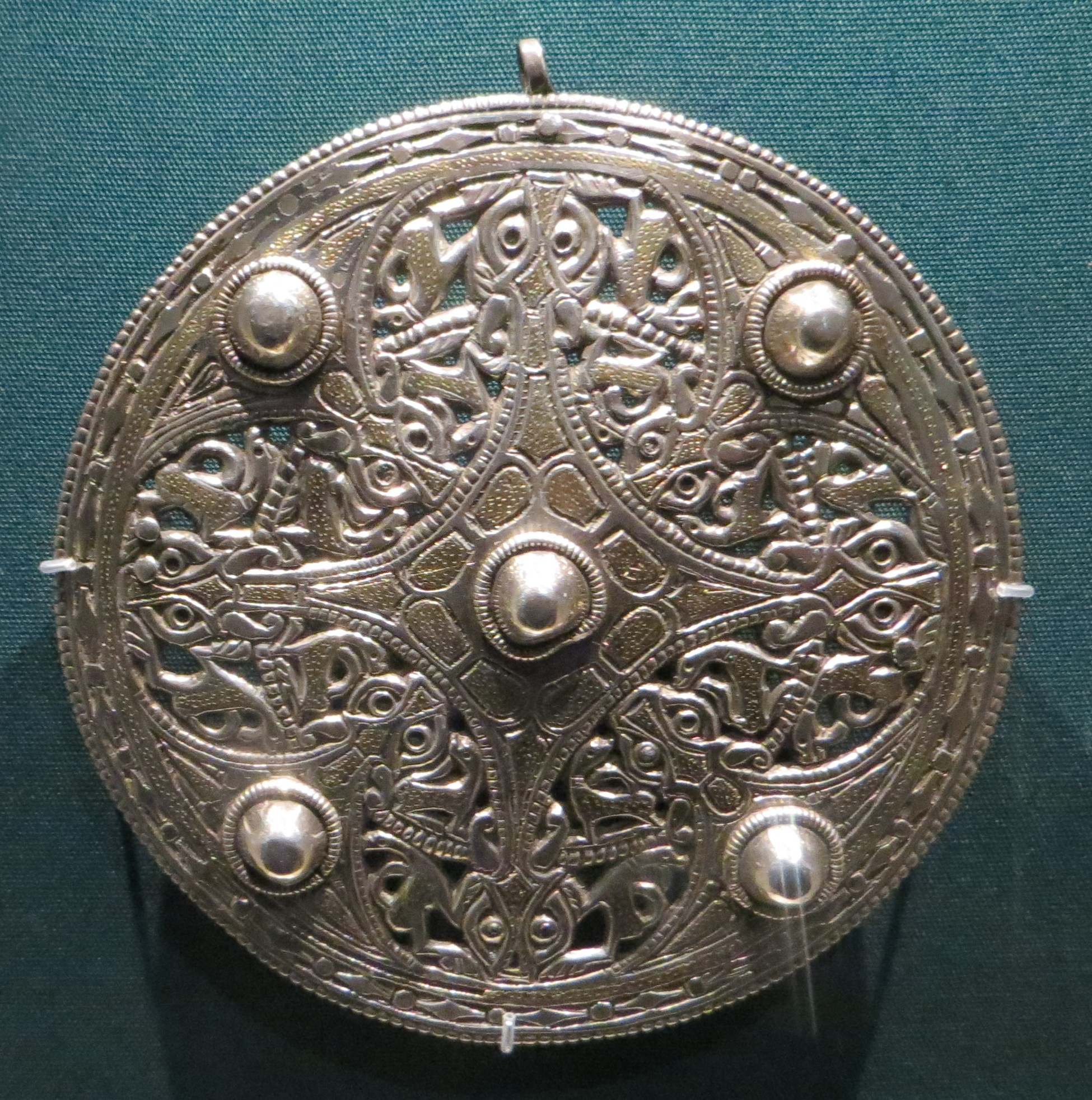
Strickland Brooch, 9th century

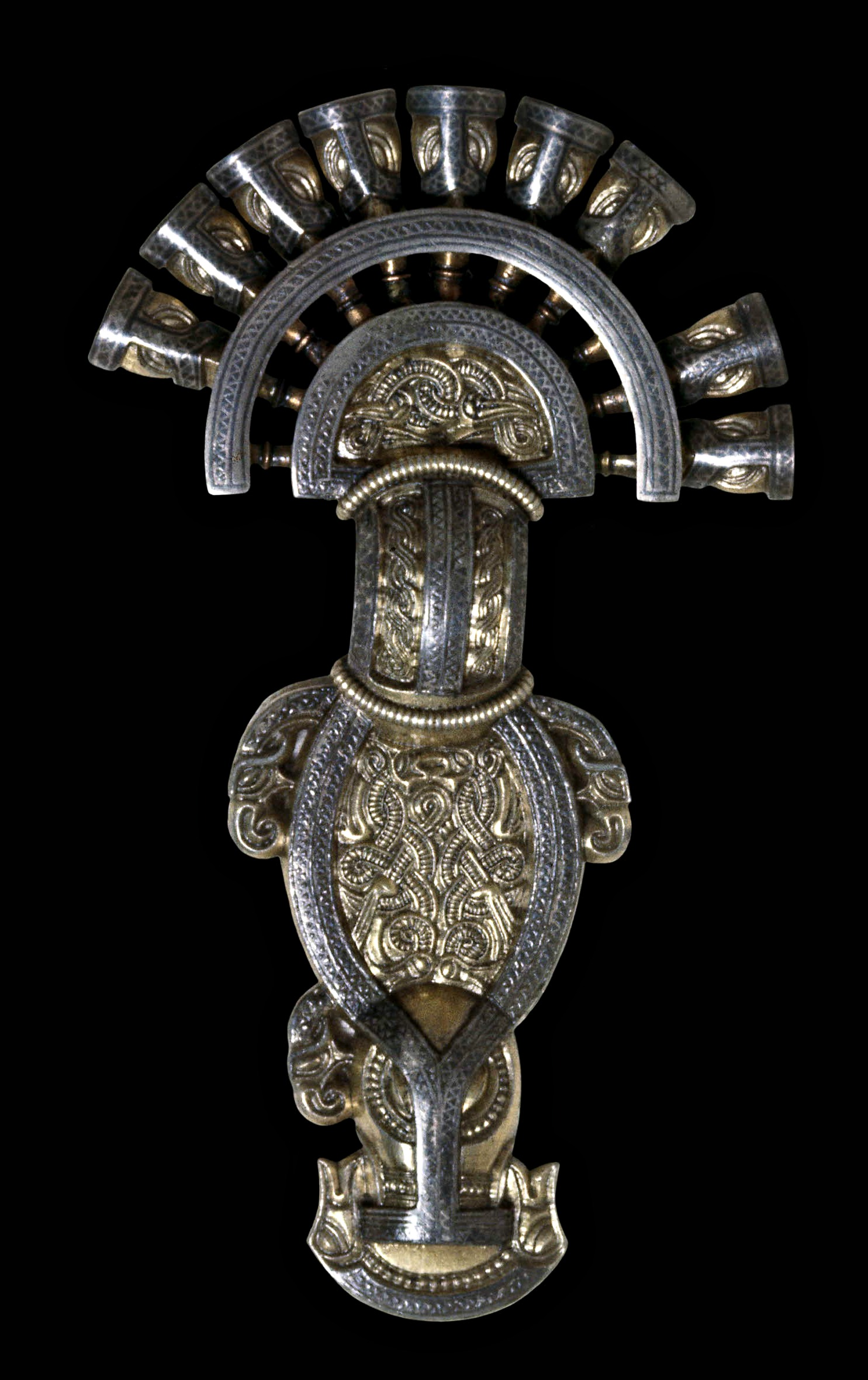
Radiate-headed brooch, early 7th century

Anglo-Saxon brooches are a large group of decorative brooches found in England from the fifth to the eleventh centuries. In the early Anglo-Saxon era, there were two main categories of brooch: the long (bow) brooch and the circular (disc) brooch. The long brooch category includes cruciform, square-headed, radiate-headed, and small-long brooch brooches. The long brooches went out of fashion by the end of the sixth century.

The circular brooch form developed from jewelled disc brooches produced in Kent in the early sixth century. In the early Anglo-Saxon era, the circular brooch type included the saucer, the applied saucer, the button, the annular (circular ring form), the penannular (incomplete ring), and the quoit (double ring, one of each of the previous types) brooches. The circular was the most common brooch form during the middle to late Anglo-Saxon era, with the enamelled and non-enamelled circular brooches being the predominant brooch styles. There are a few styles that fall into the miscellaneous category. These include the bird and S-shaped brooch of the early Anglo-Saxon era and the safety-pin, strip, ottonian, rectangular, and bird motif of the middle to late Anglo-Saxon era.

The majority of brooches found in early Anglo-Saxon England were Continental styles that had migrated from Europe. These styles evolved over time in England. In the sixth century, metalworkers from Kent, and eventually other regions, started creating brooches using their own distinctive styles and techniques. The best-known examples of Anglo-Saxon brooches are the Sutton brooch, the Sarre brooch, the Fuller Brooch, the Strickland Brooch, and the Kingston Brooch.

== Overview ==
The middle of the fifth century marked the beginning of Anglo-Saxon England. The Anglo-Saxon era consists of three different time periods: The early Anglo-Saxon era, which spans the mid-fifth to the beginning of the seventh century; the middle Anglo-Saxon era, which covers the seventh through the ninth centuries; and the late Anglo-Saxon era, which includes the tenth and eleventh centuries.

The brooches worn in Anglo-Saxon England were decorative clothing fasteners, with the general purpose of joining pieces of clothing together. They typically consisted of a pin, clasp, and spring, which were concealed by the front-facing plate. Depending on the style, the brooch face (or plate) could be undecorated, simply decorated or more elaborately decorated. It would vary in size and shape. These ancient brooches can be divided into two main groups, long and circular forms. Brooches were constructed from various metals, including copper alloy, iron, silver, gold or a combination of metals. They could be made using a variety of techniques, including casting, inlaying or engraving. Casting was a frequently used technique, because many brooches could be made from the same mould.

Brooches of the Anglo-Saxon era were worn primarily by women. According to clothing historian, Penelope Walton Rogers, "For the Anglo-Saxon woman, brooches, pins, clasps and buckles were as essential to her clothing as modern button and zip-fasteners. However decorative their appearance and however much they were used to express social and cultural identity, their primary role was to hold edges of garments together and to control loose flaps of clothing." Although women were the primary users of brooches in the early Anglo-Saxon era, archaeological evidence reveals that brooches were not found as often as a dress accessory in the late Anglo-Saxon period. Circular brooch styles, especially small, disc brooches were an ideal shape and size to function as cloak fasteners. This style of brooch, undecorated, is often associated with men after the beginning of the seventh century.

== Chronology ==
The majority of brooches found in early Anglo-Saxon England were Continental styles that had migrated from Europe and Scandinavia. The long brooch is the style associated with early Anglo-Saxon England. Circular brooches first appeared in England in the middle of the fifth century. During the sixth century, craftsmen from Kent began manufacturing brooches using their own distinctive styles and techniques. The Kentish square-headed brooch and the circular (Kentish) jewelled brooches were styles originating in Kent. The circular form was the preferred brooch type by the end of the sixth century.

During the seventh century, all brooches in England were in decline. They reappeared in the eighth century and continued to be fashionable through the end of the Anglo-Saxon era. Brooch styles were predominantly circular by the middle to late Anglo-Saxon era. During this time period, the preferred styles were the annular and jewelled (Kentish) disc brooch styles. The circular forms can be divided generally into enamelled and non-enamelled styles.

A few non-circular style were fashionable during the eighth through eleventh centuries. The ansate, the safety-pin, the strip and a few other styles can be included in this group. Ansate brooches were traditional brooches from Europe migrated to England and became fashionable in the late Anglo-Saxon period. Safety-pin brooches, more abundant in the early Anglo-Saxon period became more uncommon by the seventh century and by the eighth century, evolve into the strip brooch. Miscellaneous brooches during this time period include the bird, the ottonian, the rectangle and the cross motif. The best-known examples of Anglo-Saxon brooches are the Sutton brooch, the Sarre brooch, the Fuller Brooch, the Strickland Brooch, the Kingston Brooch and the silver brooches of the Pentney Hoard.

== Early Anglo-Saxon brooches ==
=== Long brooches ===
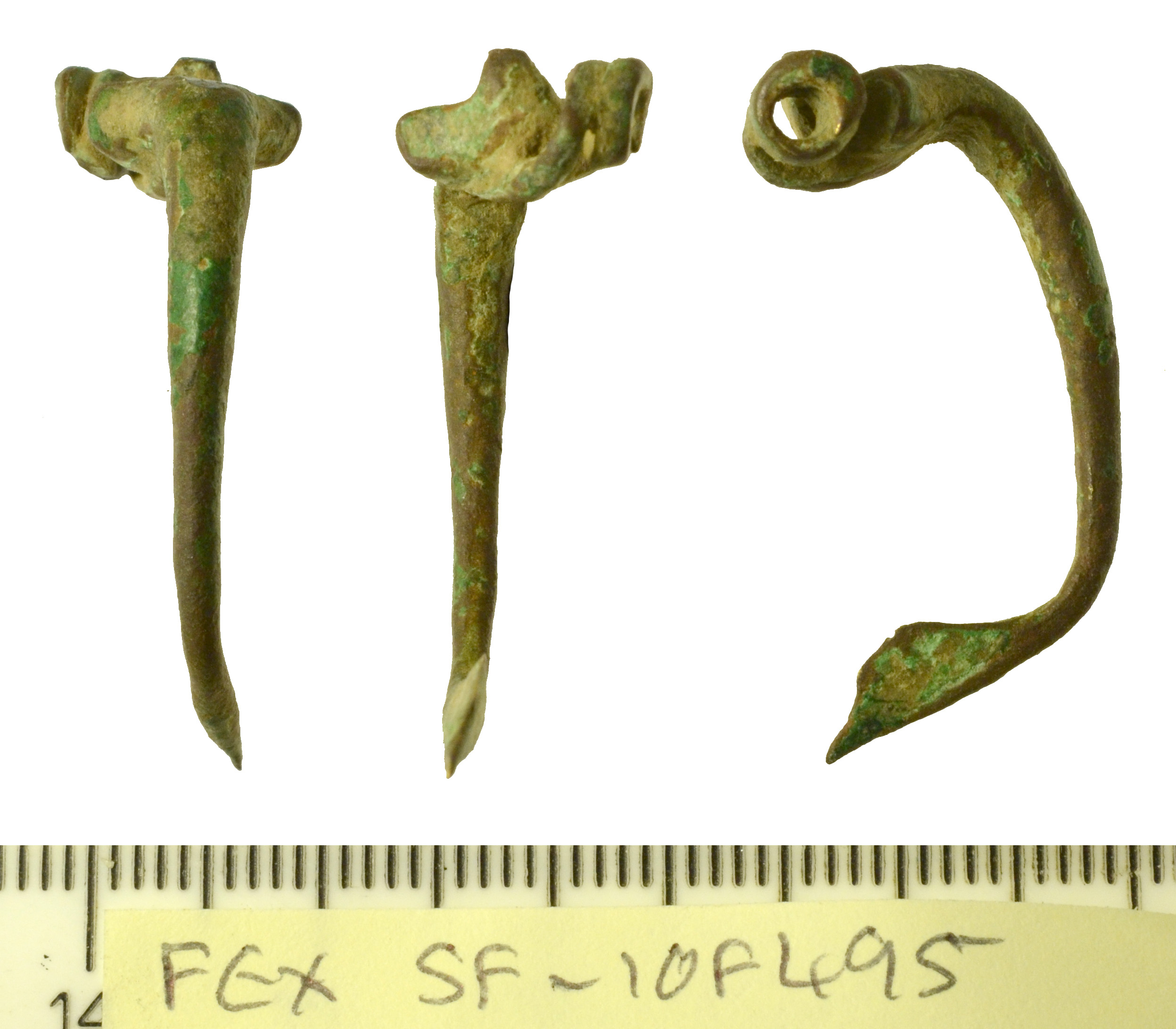
Iron-age bow brooch

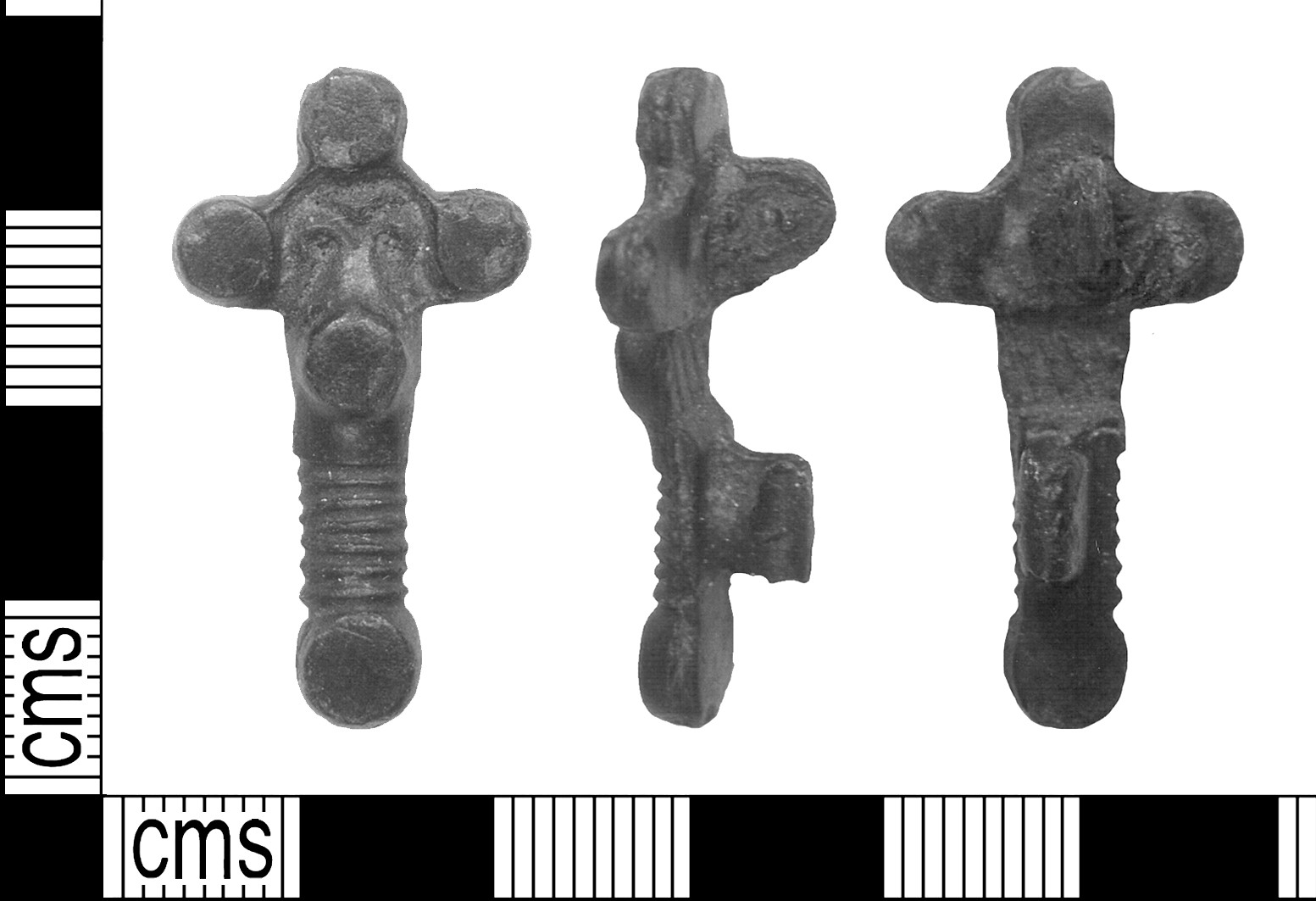
Anglo-Saxon Bow brooch

Long brooches, also known as bow brooches, originated from Roman Iron Age bow-shaped brooches. They include several varieties of square-headed brooches, as well as small-long, cruciform, equal-headed and radiate-headed brooches. Longs consist of a head and a foot and a section in the middle called the bow. The bow section curves from the head to the foot, and the angle of the arch can vary depending upon the style. Roman brooches had a much larger bow than Anglo-Saxon brooches. By the fifth century, the brooch bow was just a small bump in the middle.

==== Square-headed ====
Square-headed brooches typically have rectangular heads, not square as described by their name. The foot is generally lozenge-shaped. This brooch is cross-shaped in some types, with animal ornamentation where the bow and foot connect. The square-heads originated in Scandinavia in the fifth century and spread to England and south into Europe toward the end of the fifth century. In England, there are various types of square-headed brooches, including the great square-head, the small square-head and the Kentish square-head. Square-headed brooches were frequently found in Kent and East Anglian graves.

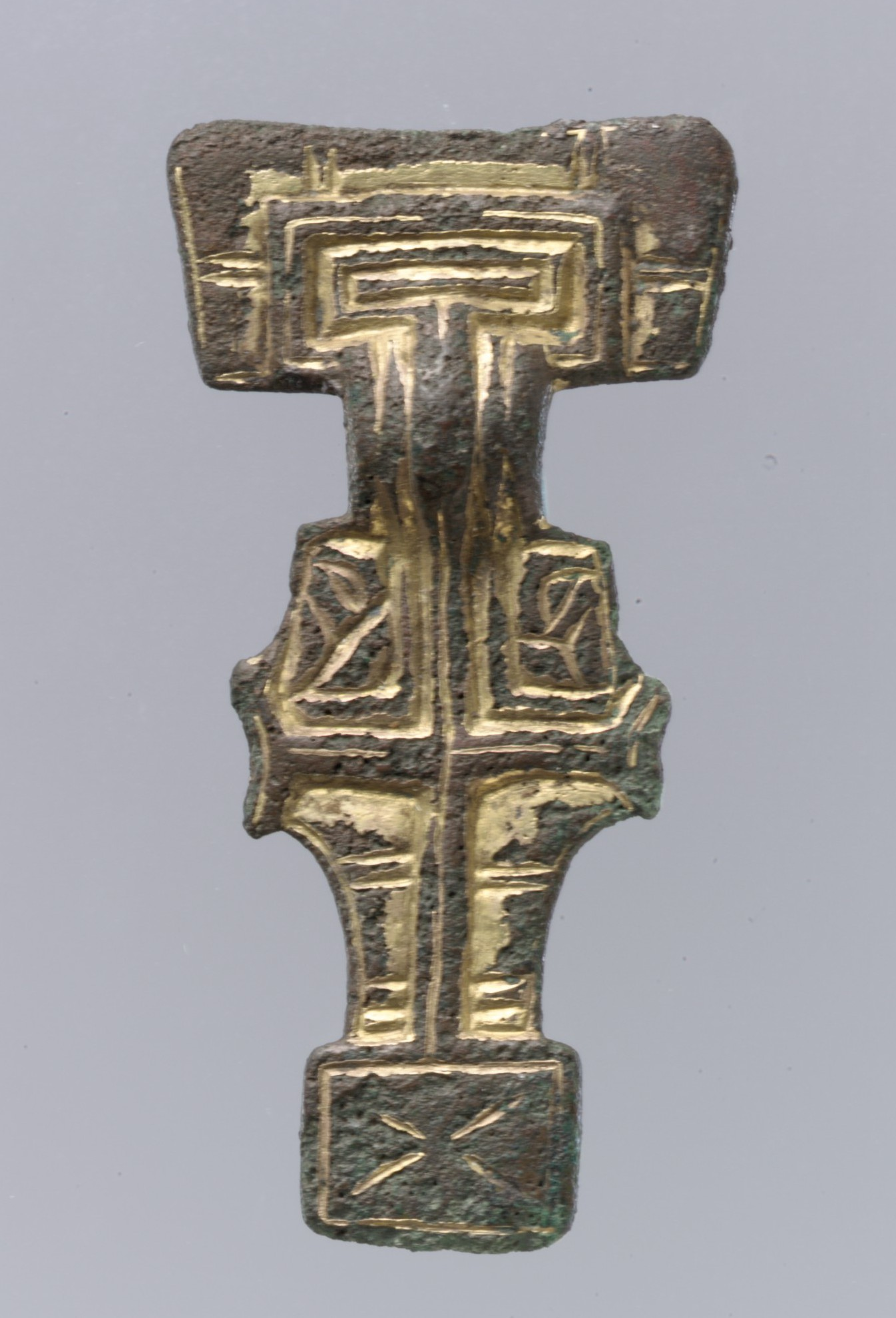
Square-headed brooch

===== Great square-headed =====
Great square-headed brooches measure 100-150mm long. They are generally large and heavy brooches. They are the most common brooch style found in high-status female graves in the fifth and sixth centuries. Great square-headed brooches are generally made of copper alloy, and surface treatments of gilding, silvering and tinning are common. These jewellery items are typically decorated in Salin's Style I. Analysis of brooch artefacts has revealed that each square-headed brooch is unique and probably custom made for individuals by traveling craftsmen.

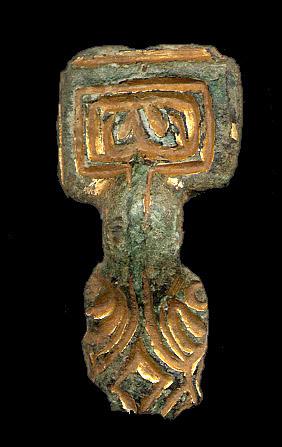
Small square-headed brooch

===== Kentish Square-headed =====
There are two main styles of Kentish square-headed brooch: the Jutish-style and the Continental-style. The Jutish-style brooches closely resemble brooches originating in Jutland, in the amount of animal decoration and often the inclusion of a disc on the bow of the brooch. The Continental-style consists of simpler animal decoration and is usually combined with inset garnets. Both types contain silver or silver-gilt, although the Continental-style brooch was also gilded with copper alloy. These brooches were cast in small and medium lengths, 45-100mm long.

===== Small square-headed =====
These brooches are smaller versions of the great square-headed brooches. They are typically made from copper alloy, with a small percentage made from silver. They are usually gilded and can have relief decoration. They can be dated from 500 to 575 AD. They are found throughout southern England, but are primarily associated with eastern Kent. These brooches were usually decorated in symbols and cryptic marks instead of the geometric and animal designs associated with the larger square-headed brooches.

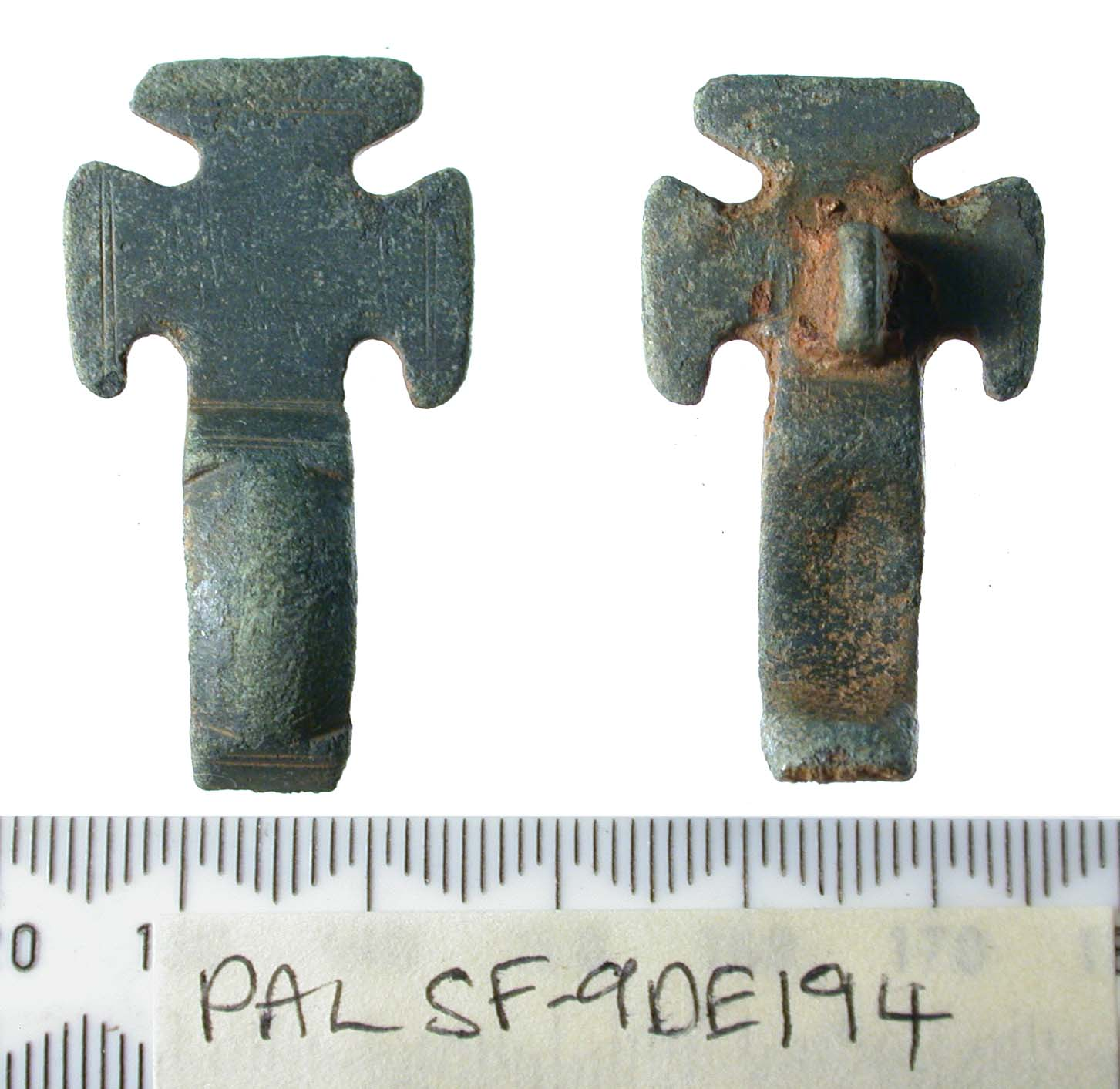
Small-long brooch

==== Small-long ====
The small-long brooch is similar to the cruciform and the great square-headed brooch. These copper alloy brooches have the greatest number of design variations of Anglo-Saxon brooches created in the early Anglo-Saxon era. The small-long head includes square, trefoil and cross shapes and the foot can be found in triangular, lobed, crescent, bifurcated or lozenge shapes.

Small-longs are predominantly found in East Kingdom of East Anglia, although they are widely found throughout England. They are decorated in simple designs, usually consisting of a small bronze bow. They are similar to the cruciform style brooch style and have been described as an inexpensive substitute to the cruciform brooch. They can be dated from the late fifth to the sixth century. These brooches disappear from Anglian sites earlier than other places in England.

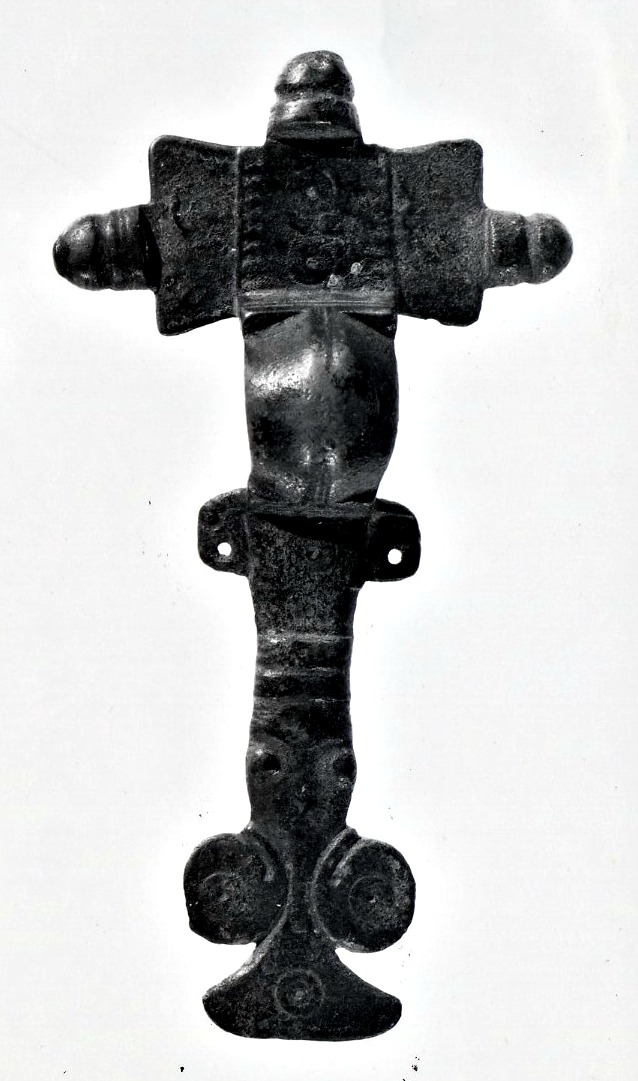
Cruciform brooch

==== Cruciform ====
Cruciform brooches are fairly common in early Anglo-Saxon England. Cruciform style brooches may have originated in both Europe and Scandinavia during the second half of the 4th century. They are found predominantly in eastern England, from Kent and as far north as York. They were worn from the early fifth to the middle of the sixth century. Cruciform brooches have been found in Anglo-Saxon graves in three separate body locations: two brooches at the shoulders pointing up, two brooches on the chest pointing down and one brooches on the chest pointing across.

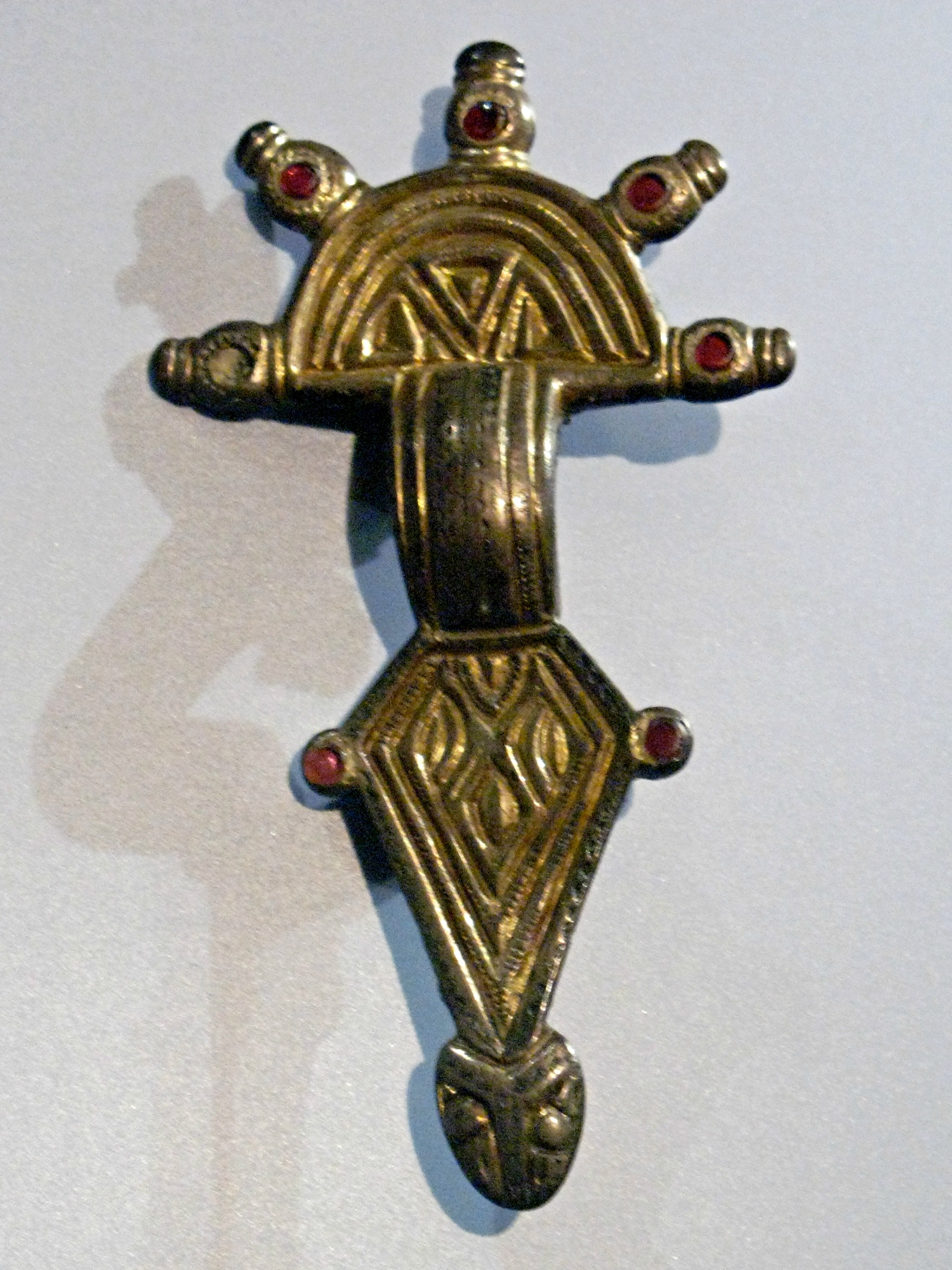
Radiate-headed brooch

A cruciform brooch can be identified by three knobs or terminals on the head of the brooch. Cruciforms are usually cast in copper alloy, with the knobs often made separately. Cruciforms can range in ornamentation from simple to a more elaborate decoration.

==== Radiate-headed ====
Radiate-headed brooches were popular in sixth century Kent, probably the result of the high number of Frankish people migrating to the region". This brooch style originated on the Continent in Francia. Radiate-heads are typically made from copper alloy with a small percentage being made in silver. Their distinguishing characteristic is a semi-circular head plate with ornamented knobs or terminals radiating outward. The brooch head has been found in triangular and oval shapes. The foot is typically triangular or lozenge-shaped.

==== Supporting-arm ====
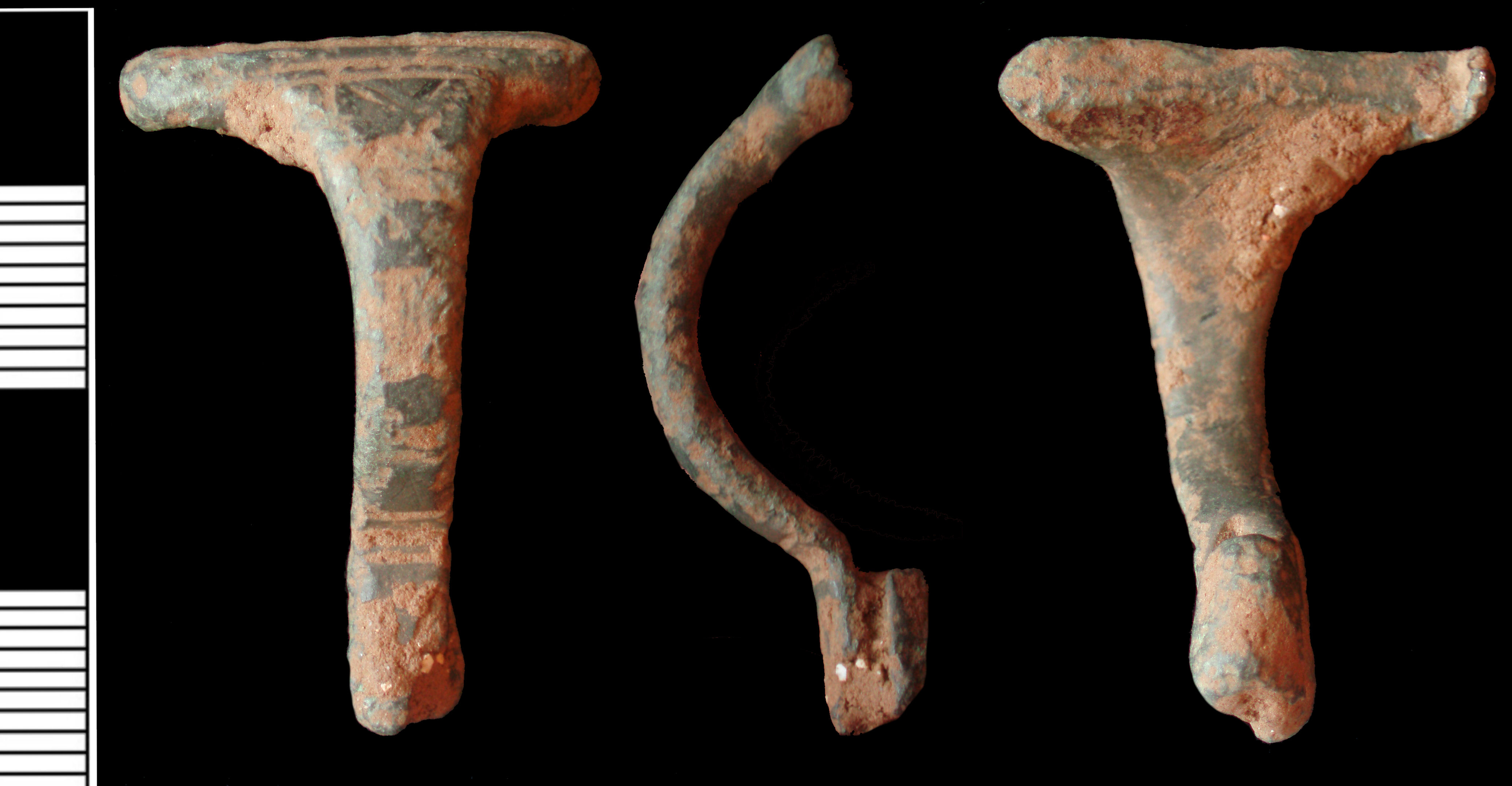
Supporting Arm Brooch

The supporting arm brooch is a T-shaped brooch. It dates to the early Anglo-Saxon era, 400 to 450 AD. This brooch style evolved from Roman brooches, but it also displays Germanic characteristics. According to the Portable Antiquities Scheme database, "The ‘supporting arm’ is in fact wings, each with a perforated lug on the reverse to hold the pin bar, around which the spring is wrapped. There can be a third or even a fourth perforated lug in the centre. The foot is normally short and slightly flared, with transverse grooves and bevelled edges."

==== Equal-arm ====
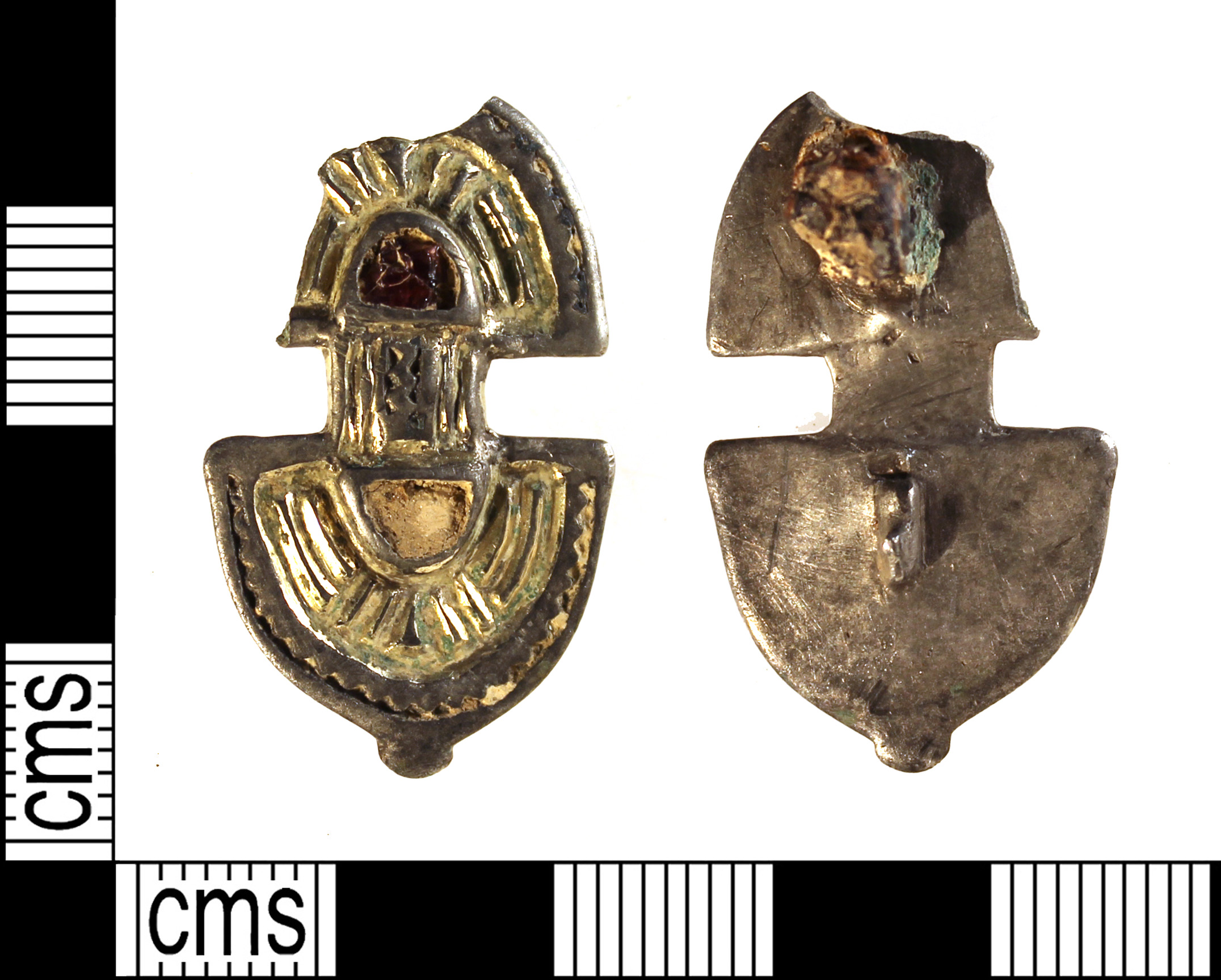
Equal armed brooch

Equal-arm brooches typically have identically shaped and sized head and feet. They are inspired by similarly designed Roman brooches. In the Early Anglo-Saxon time period, equal arms have triangular head and feet. The three styles of equal armed brooches are: wide, long and Anglian. The wide equal-arm is a large brooch with a triangular head and foot, narrowing toward the bow. These brooches are often made in the Saxon Relief style. The long equal-arm brooch is a much longer than wide brooch compared to the other two equal-arm styles. The terminals generally taper away from the bow, which is different from the wide and Anglian equal-arm. The Anglian style is not common. The name indicates where the brooch is generally found, East Anglia. The Anglian equal-arm brooch generally has no decoration.

=== Circular brooches ===
Circular brooches, also known as disc brooches, are circular-shaped brooches, usually decorated with various geometrical designs. They are generally made in copper alloy can also be found in silver and gold. These brooches were popular in early Anglo-Saxon England in the fifth and sixth centuries.

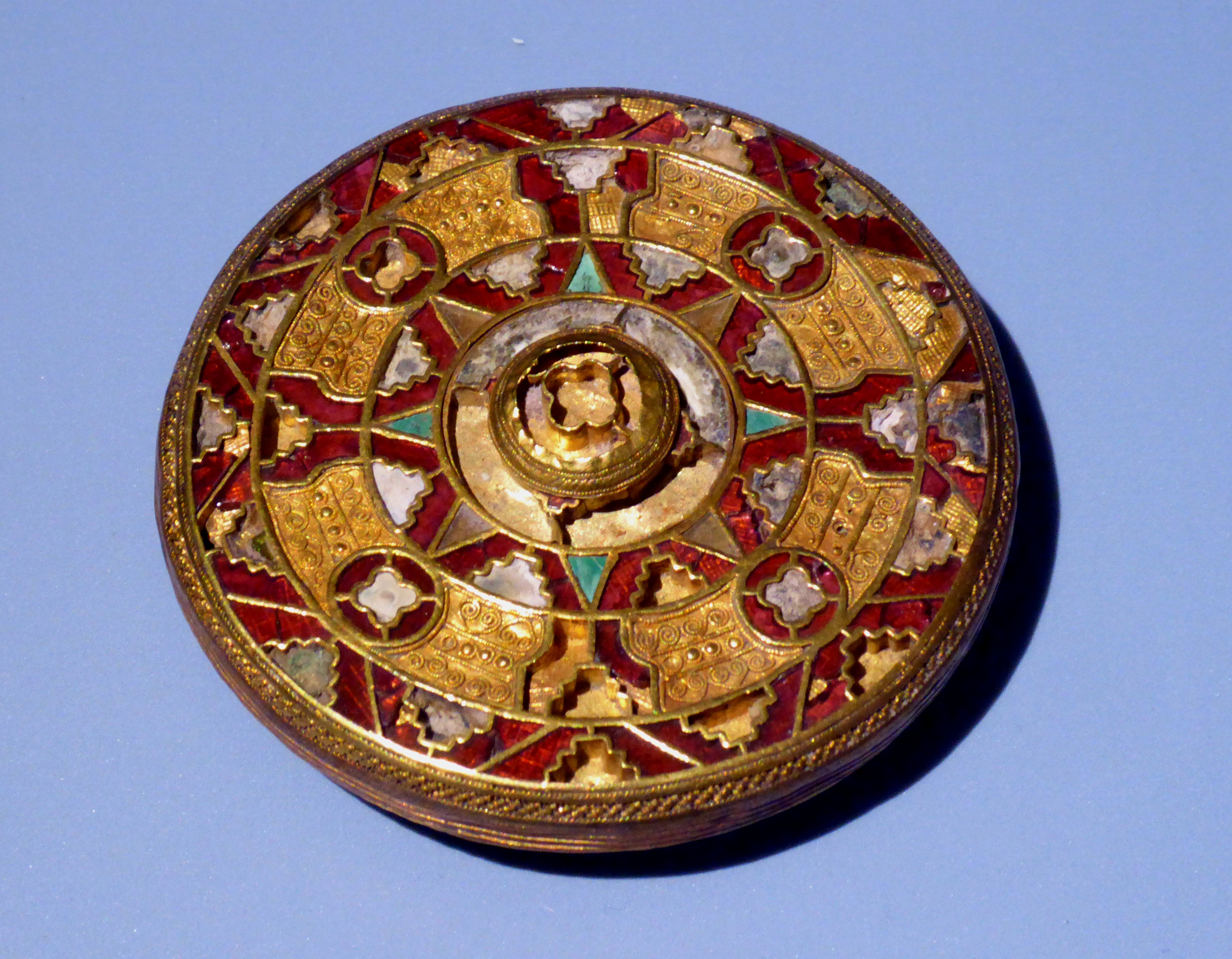
7th century disc brooch

==== Disc ====
The plain disc brooch was cast in copper alloy. The front plate was either plain or decorated with a simple pattern, usually a carved or stamped design. The Kentish disc brooches were a more highly ornamented version of the plain disc brooch with inlaid garnet or multi-coloured glass. It is possible that Anglo-Saxon disc brooches developed from earlier Romano-British disc brooches. The brooches are small, primarily 30-40mm in diameter. They are often found with a white metal coating on the front plate. matching and un-matching pairs. Disc brooches date from 450 to 550 AD during the same time that gilt saucer brooches were popular.

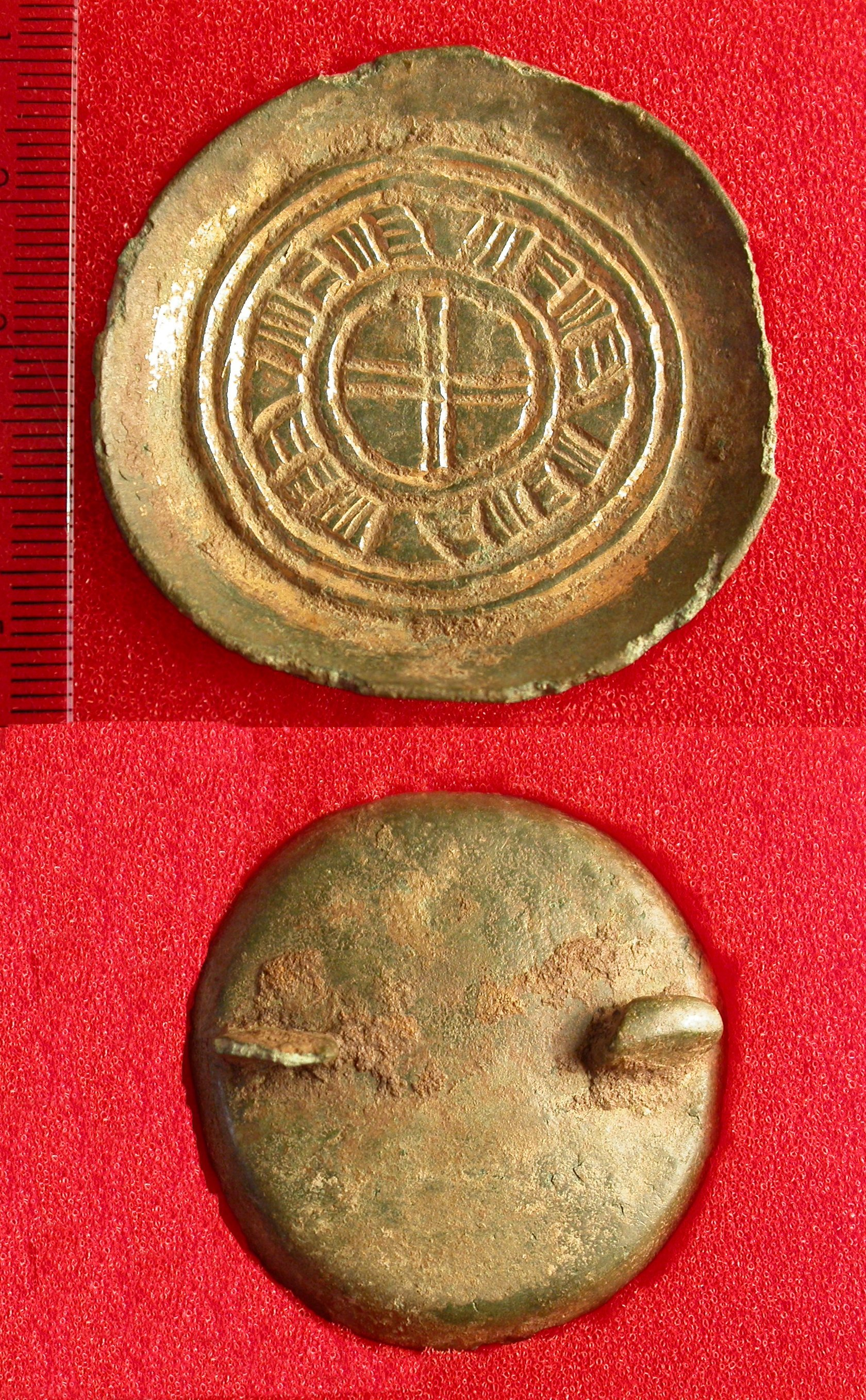
Saucer brooch

==== Saucer ====
A saucer brooch is a circular-shaped brooch with a decorated front plate, surrounded by an upturned rim. The brooch was typically cast in a single piece in copper alloy, gilded and then secured with a pin. There are many varieties of ornamentation, generally geometric in design. Saucers were popular in Saxon areas in south and west England. They have been found in large numbers in Anglo-Saxon burial sites, dating from the fifth century to the early seventh century. Gilded saucer brooches are found in female graves in every part of southern and central England. There are three categories of saucer brooch: saucer, applied and button.

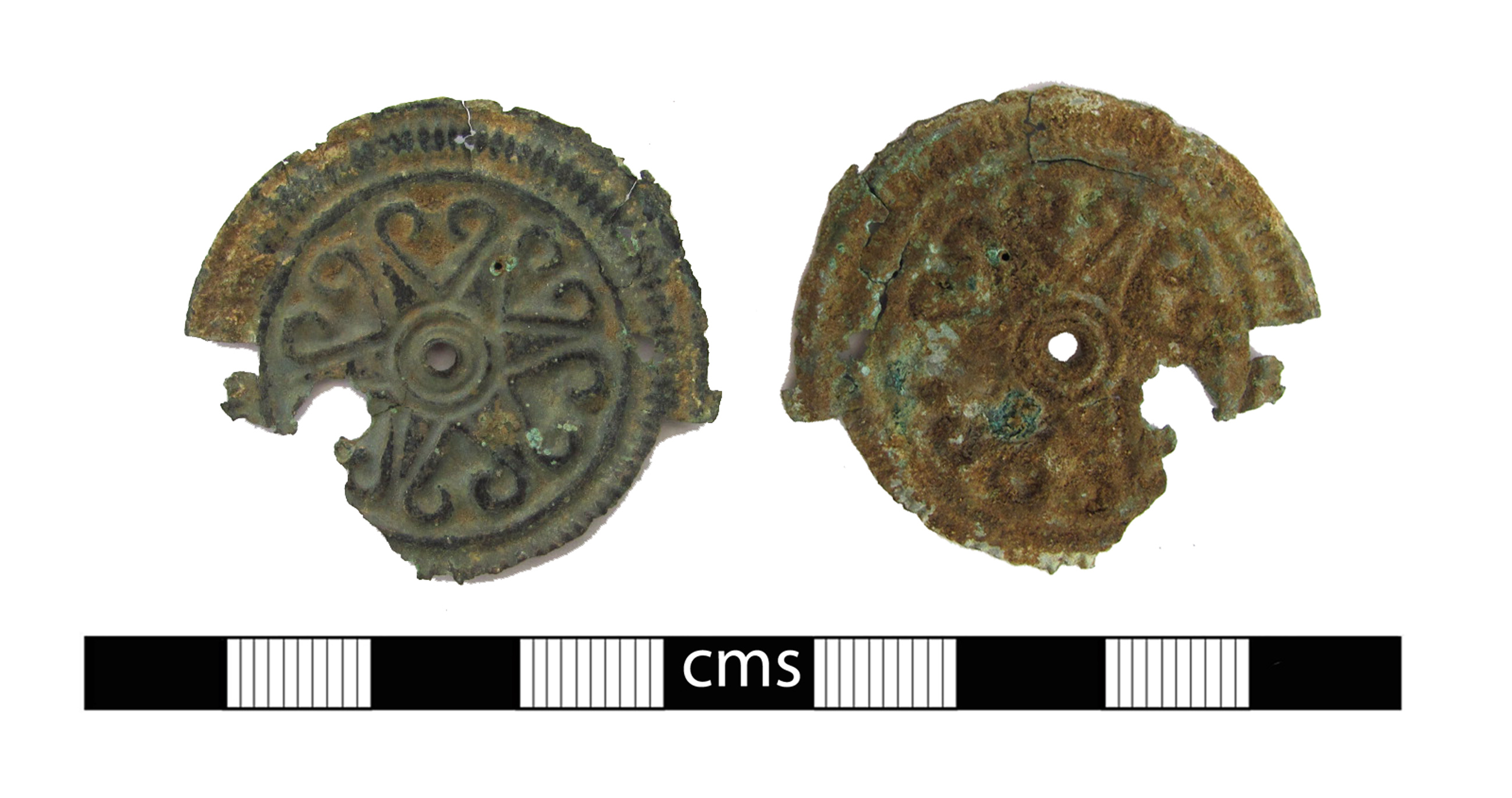
Applied brooch plate

==== Applied ====
The applied brooch, also known as the applied saucer or applied disc brooch, resembles the saucer brooch in appearance. This brooch is assembled in separate parts, unlike the saucer brooch which is cast as an entire piece. Because the brooch is constructed in separate pieces, archaeological excavations rarely uncover applied brooches that have not broken apart. The applied brooch is composed of a circular back plate, with a disc of gilt embossed foil on top, a bronze rim fastened to the edge, a pin support and a pin clasp. These brooches date from the mid-fifth to the late sixth century, and are found primarily in southern and eastern England.

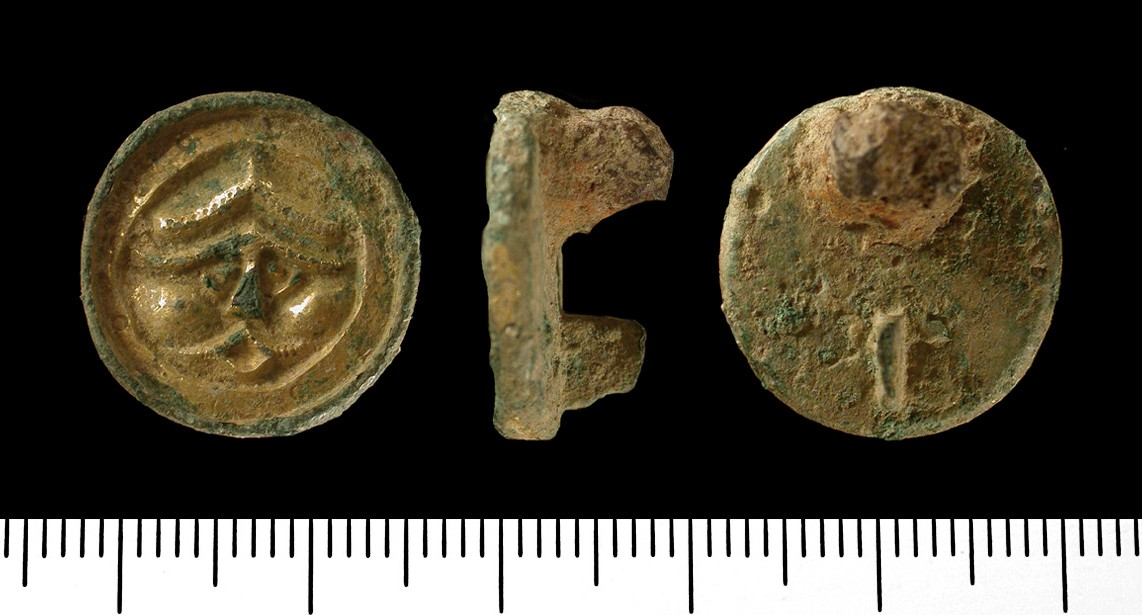
Button brooch

==== Button ====
The button brooch is a small brooch, similar in shape to the saucer brooch. The brooch is typically decorated with the design of a human face. A popular button design was an image of a "chubby mustachioed face". The brooch was used in the fifth and sixth centuries, primarily Southern England.The button ranges in size from 26—31mm diameter for brooches found in the region from the Thames Valley down to the coast of Southern England to those of Kent, which tend to be smaller, 15–23 mm diameter. The Kent buttons were typically worn singly on the chest.

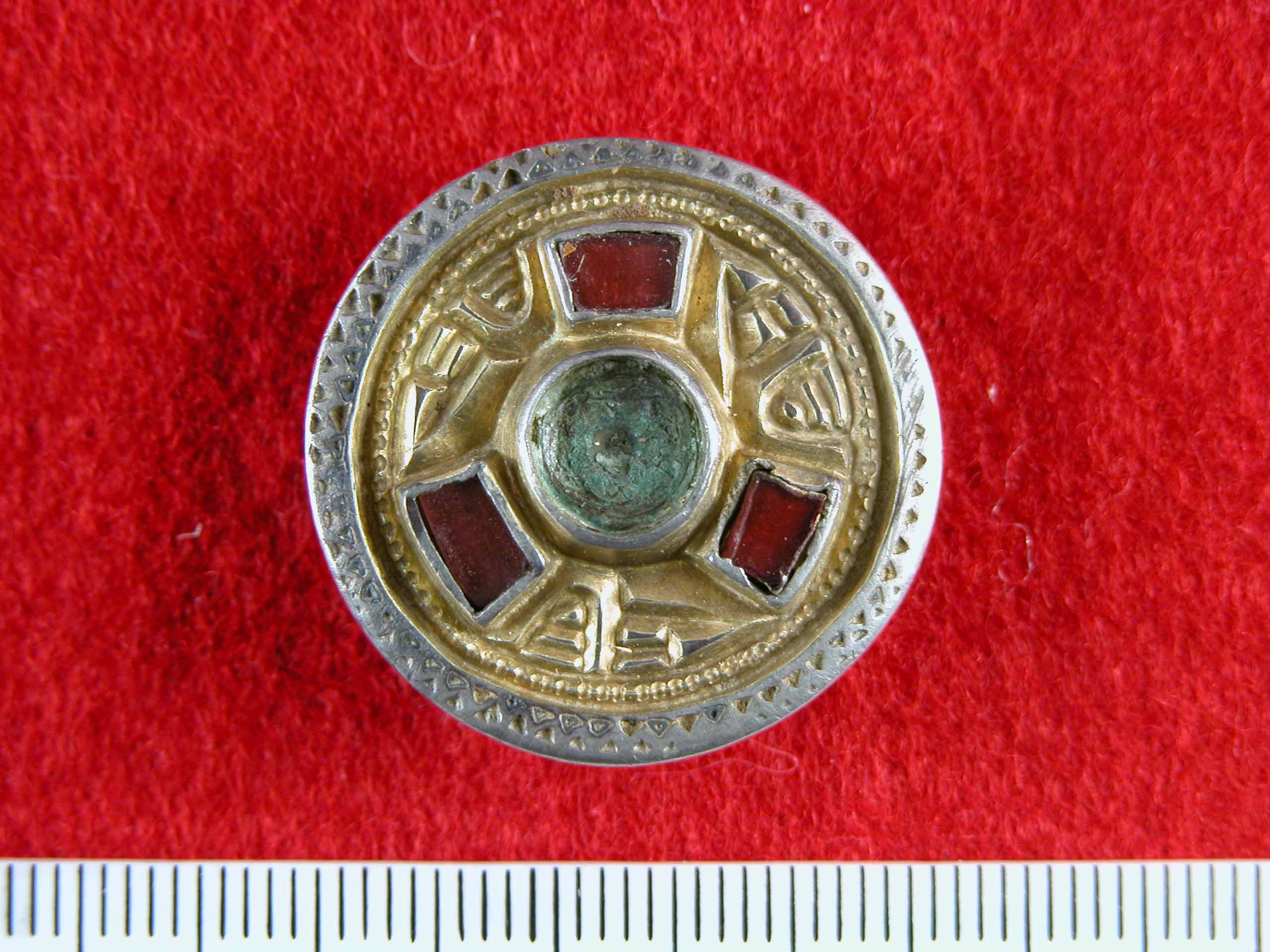
Jewelled disc brooch

==== Jewelled disc ====
Jewelled (also known as Kentish) disc brooches are complex, opulent brooches. At the beginning of the sixth century, jewellery craftsmen in Kent began to develop their own brooch styles based on a combination of existing Anglo-Saxon styles and techniques in addition to traditional European jewellery designs. These uncommon brooches, all inlaid with garnet, can be grouped into three main types: jewelled keystone, jewelled plated, and jewelled composite. They all date from the mid-sixth to the seventh century.

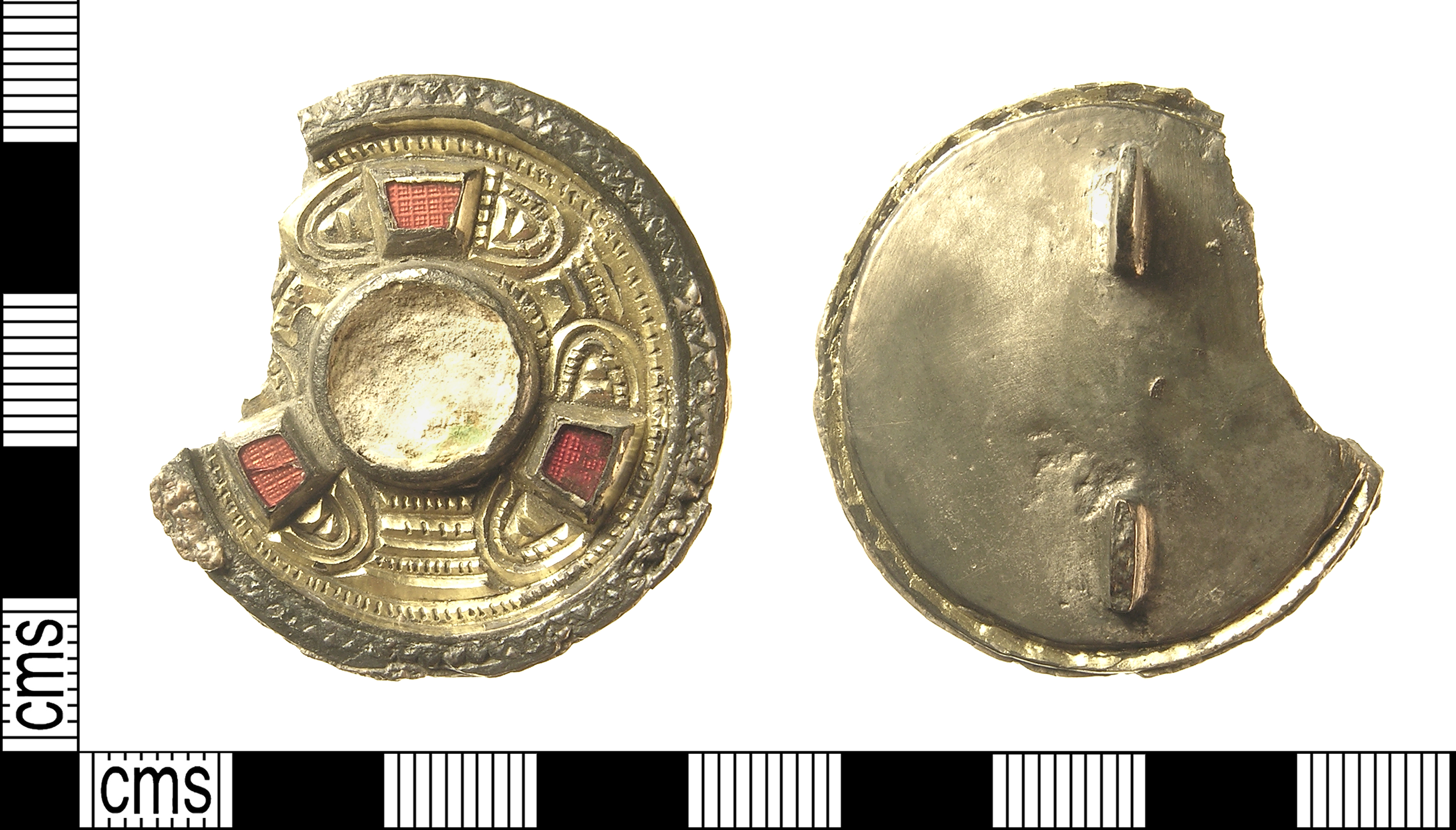
Jewelled keystone brooch

===== Jewelled keystone =====
The keystone brooch is cast in one piece, most often in silver or copper alloy. It has a circular setting surrounded by three or four keystone garnets or pieces of glass and alternating sections of raised decoration, often in Style I. The brooch is usually edged with niello and a gilded rim. The jewelled keystone varies in detail and size from small and simple, 23–40 mm diameter, to larger and more elaborate, 32–52 mm diameter. Keystone brooches were generally worn individually near the throat.

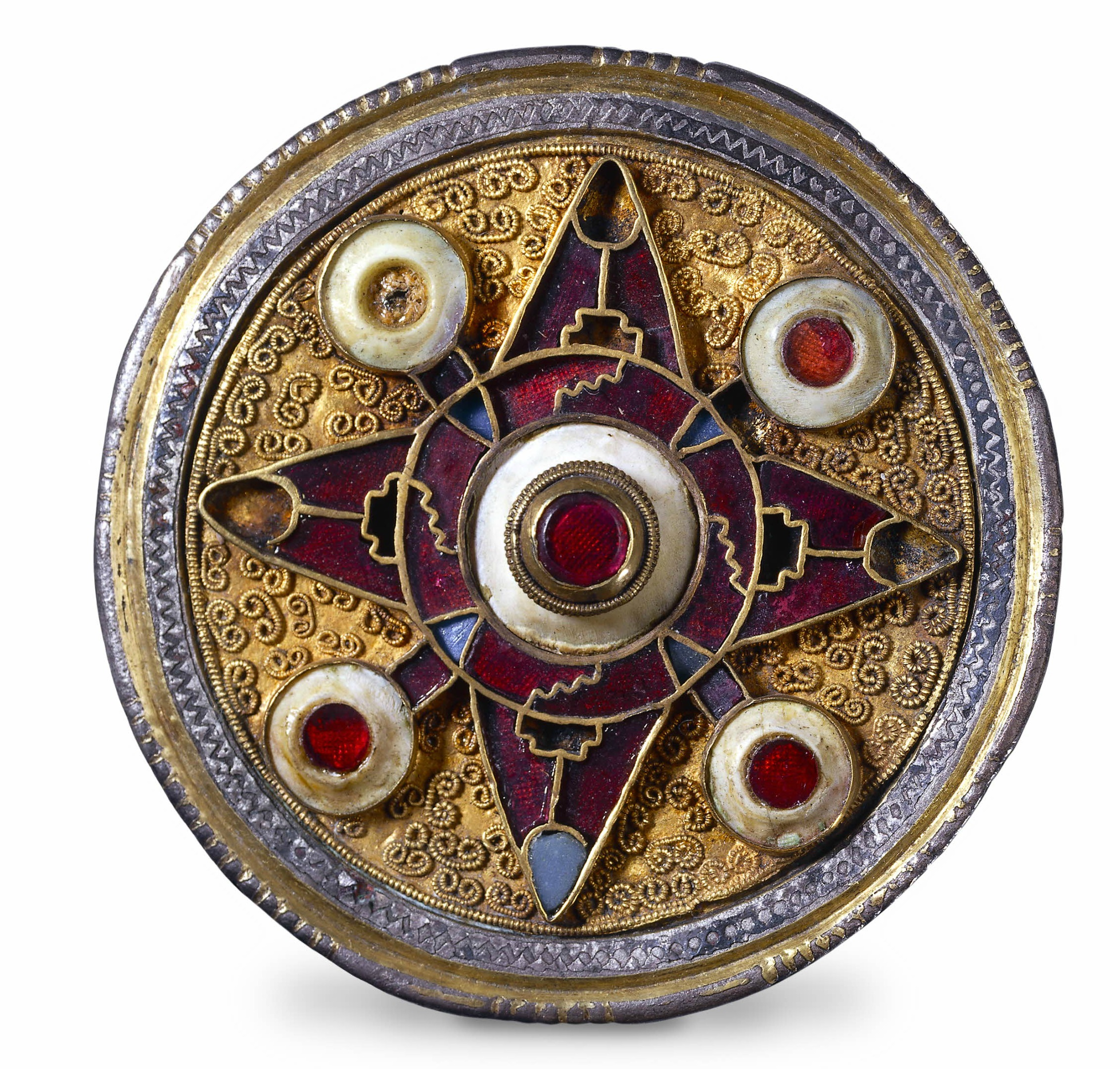
Plated disc brooch

===== Jewelled plated =====
This brooch is rare and limited to Kent. It is typically 38-57mm in diameter, constructed in two distinct pieces: a backplate cast in silver with a raised rim, and a gold front plate that is attached to the back plate, with a circular opening where the inner setting is placed. The central setting is surrounded by filigree and cloisonné decoration, which usually includes roundels discs and multiple triangles. This brooch style dates from the late sixth to the early 7th centuries.

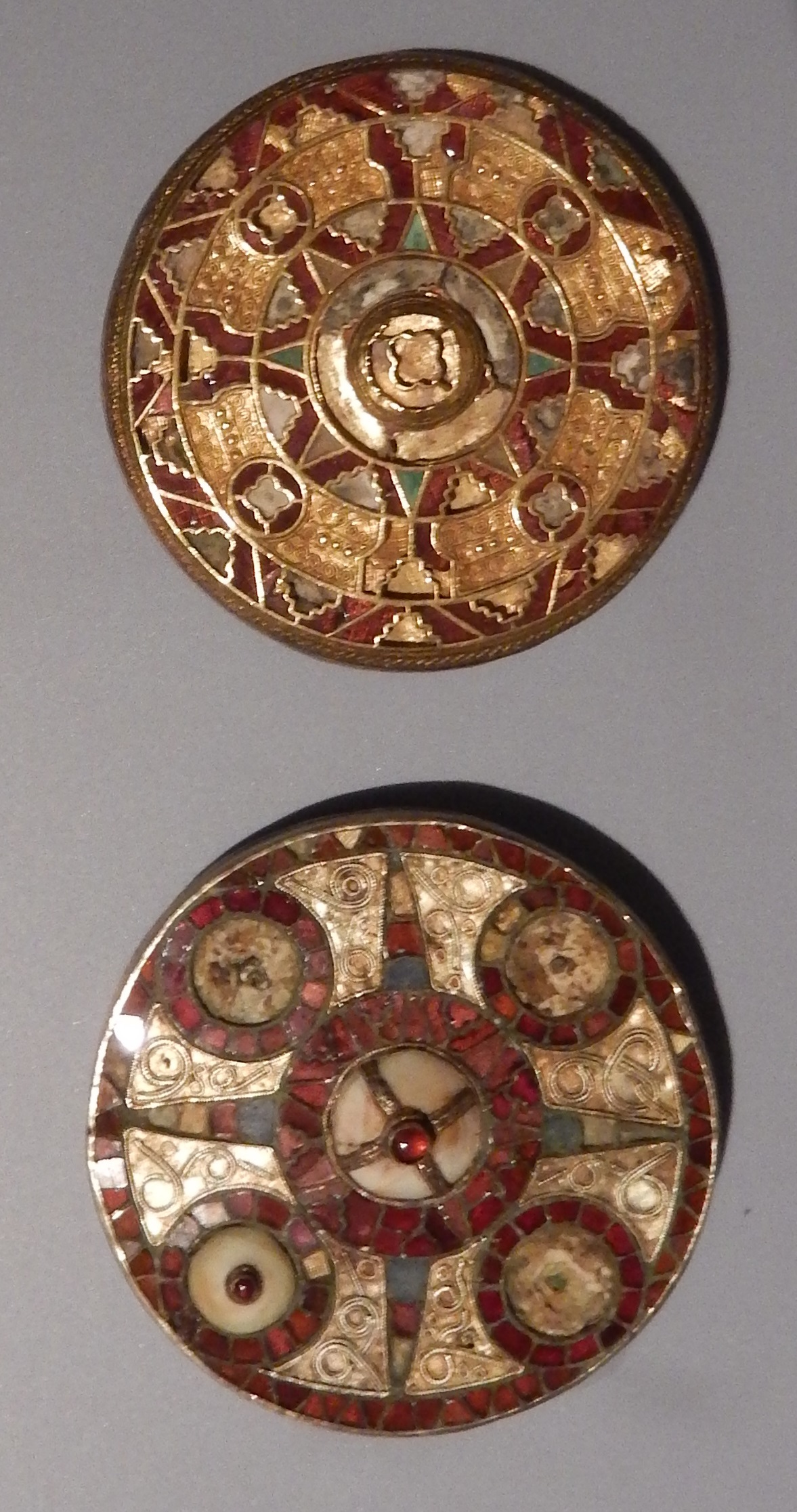
Composite disc brooches

===== Jewelled composite =====
The jewelled composite brooch is quite rare. It is constructed of three plates: a front plate made of gold, silver or copper alloy with a setting of roundels and other shapes in filigree and typically garnet and glass cloisonné. The multiple plates are bound together by rivets. This brooch is large, 40-85mm in diameter, and heavy due to the thick layer of filler between the middle and front plate. This style of brooch dates from the second half of the sixth century in Europe and the first half of the seventh century in Kent. The location of these brooches found in Anglo-Saxon graves indicates that the brooch was worn singly and quite a bit lower on the chest than other disc brooches.

According to Gale Owen-Crocker, "The Kingston Brooch is our most elaborate example of the type, with more concentric circles than any other, cloisonnés of great complexity, contrasting colours--two shades of garnet blue glass and gold--filigree ornament representing serpentine animals and, on the back, a decorated pin catch with an animal and bird heads."

==== Annular ====
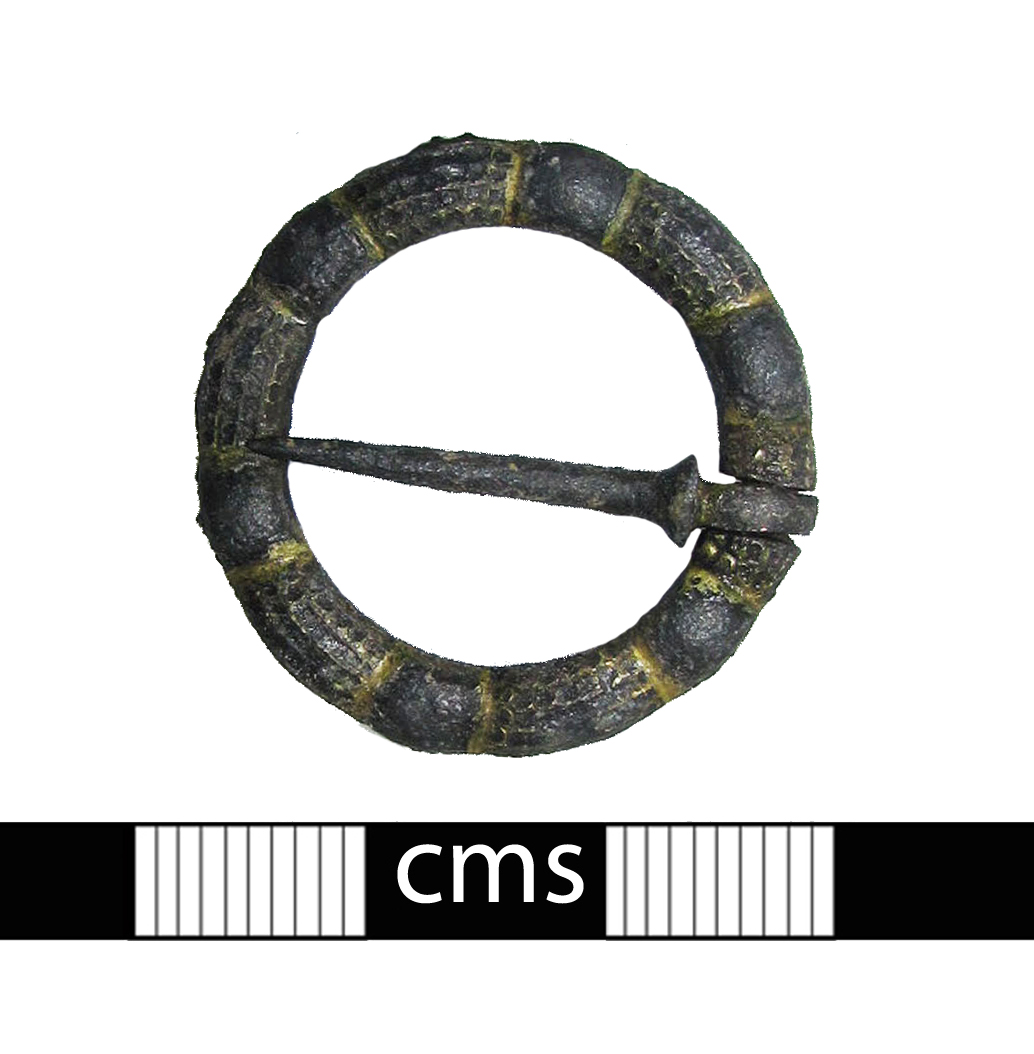
Annular brooch

The annular brooch style dates from the fifth to the seventh centuries in Anglo-Saxon England. It was common throughout southern England, the Midlands, East Anglia and North East England. It consists of a closed ring of wire or flattened metal with a pin set across it. The brooch style is plain, decorated simply with parallel marks or a circle of stamps. There are three main styles of annular brooch: flat annular, quoit style and miscellaneous.

===== Flat annular =====
The flat annular is the most common annular brooch form in early Anglo-Saxon England. It is constructed with a flat, wide circular ring, generally 35mm to 65mm in diameter. The ring is usually cast in copper alloy with a pin generally made of iron. The flat annular is constructed with either a closed ring or an open ring with overlapping ends. With the open ring style, each end contains a hole in which a small pin or bolt is passed to join the ring.

These simple brooches are often decorated with stamps or diagonal grooves, but many of this style are undecorated. The flat annular often displays a shiny surface, which is possibly the result of the brooch brushing against clothing. This glossy finish has not been observed on other early Anglo Saxon brooches.

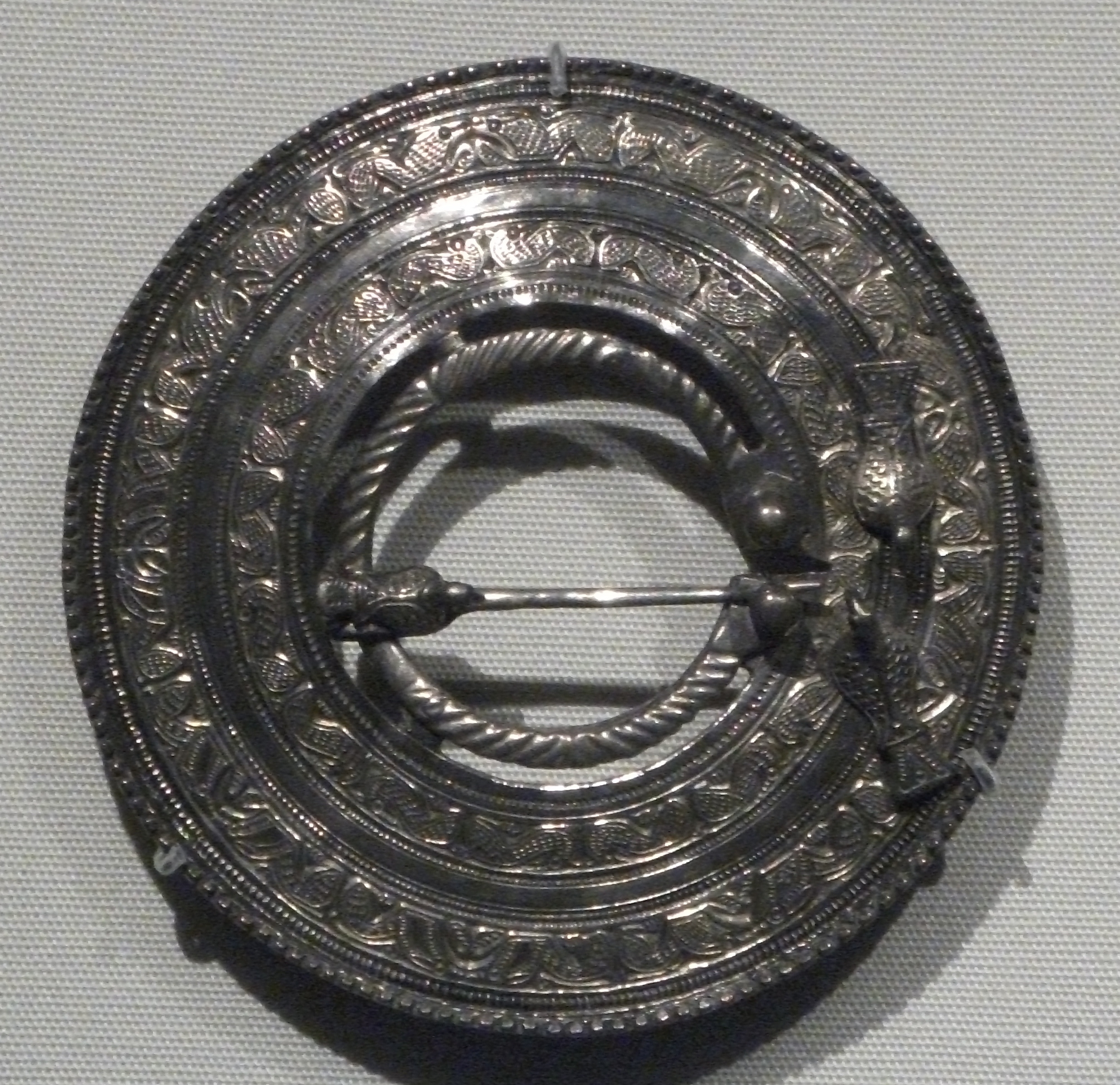
The Sarre Brooch, Quoit brooch style

===== Quoit =====
The quoit brooch combines the annular and penannular form with a double ring, and is intricately decorated. The descriptive name originates from the rings thrown in the game of Quoits. The earliest of these jewellery items were large, opulent silver brooches made in Kent in the mid-fifth century. The quoits were probably worn alone. There were variations made in copper alloy in the fifth and sixth centuries which were mostly likely worn in pairs on the shoulders.

The Quoit Brooch Style of the Anglo-Saxon era was named for this elaborate brooch. The brooch "consists of a decorated, flat ring enclosing a penannular ring, secured by a pin that passes through a slit in the penannular ring and is held by knobs. The outer annular ring is characteristically decorated in concentric circles of lightly chip-carved geometric motifs, quadrupeds, sea creatures and human masks".

The most important example of this style is the Sarre brooch, discovered in an Anglo-Saxon cemetery near Kent. It is intricately decorated with three-dimensional birds on the annular ring and on the pin. It currently can be found in the British Museum.

===== Miscellaneous =====
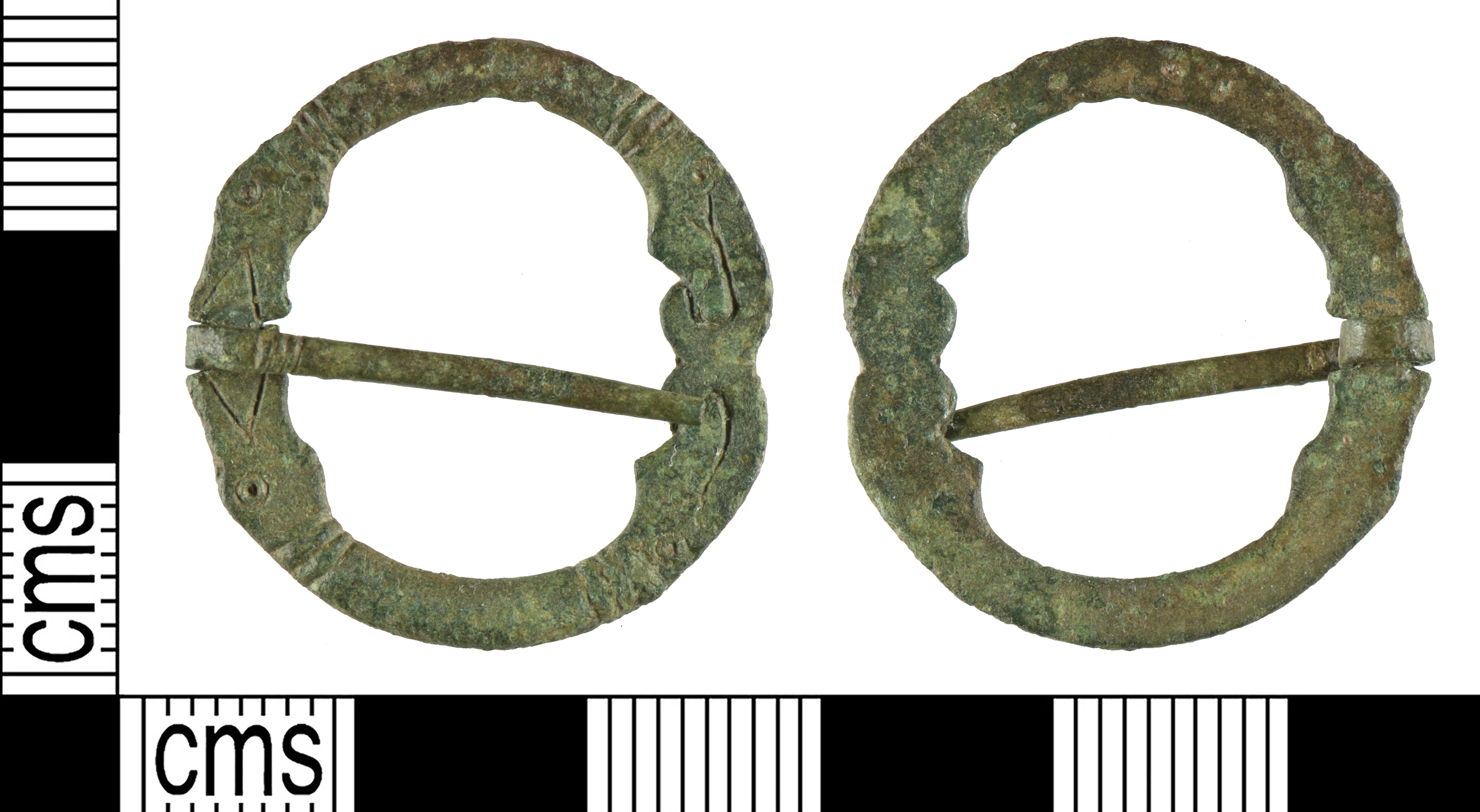
Annular brooch with animal heads

The miscellaneous forms of annular brooch are: the broad-framed brooch, the chunkier annular brooch with ribbed decoration, and the late Anglo-Saxon period annular brooches. The broad-framed was a smaller brooch with a wider frame than the typical annular brooch. The chunkier annular is uncommon. It has a thicker oval frame and cast decoration with diagonally marked edges. Scholars have been unable to date these brooches beyond a range of late fifth to early eighth century.

The late Anglo-Saxon annular brooches, popular in the sixth and seventh centuries, trended toward a smaller size over time. The ornamentation of the late style is often undecorated, simple or decorated in Style II

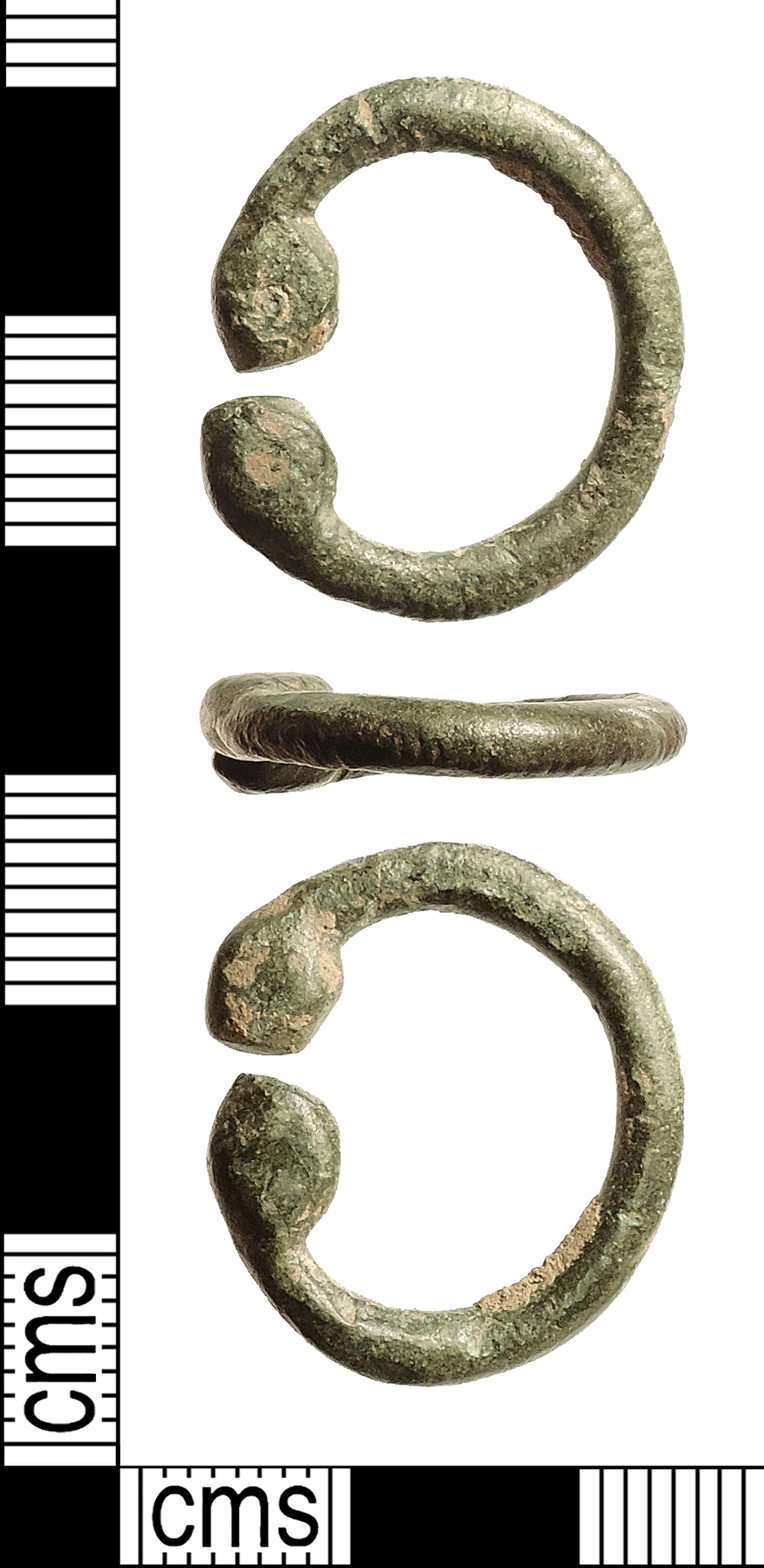
Penannular brooch

==== Penannular ====
This brooch is composed of an incomplete circle of wire or flattened metal with a pin lying across it. It is less common than the annular brooch. Similar in decoration to the annular, the penannular is usually garnished with parallel marks or a ring of stamps. There are two main categories of the pennanular brooch found in Early Anglo-Saxon graves: one form with coiled terminals and another form with multifaceted terminals. Both forms were worn at the shoulders.

The brooch was popular from the sixth to seventh centuries, although worn as late as the eighth century. It has a geographical distribution similar to the annular brooch: throughout southern England, the midlands, east anglia and north east England. After the seventh century, the pennannular brooches were made in Celtic, Irish and Viking art styles.

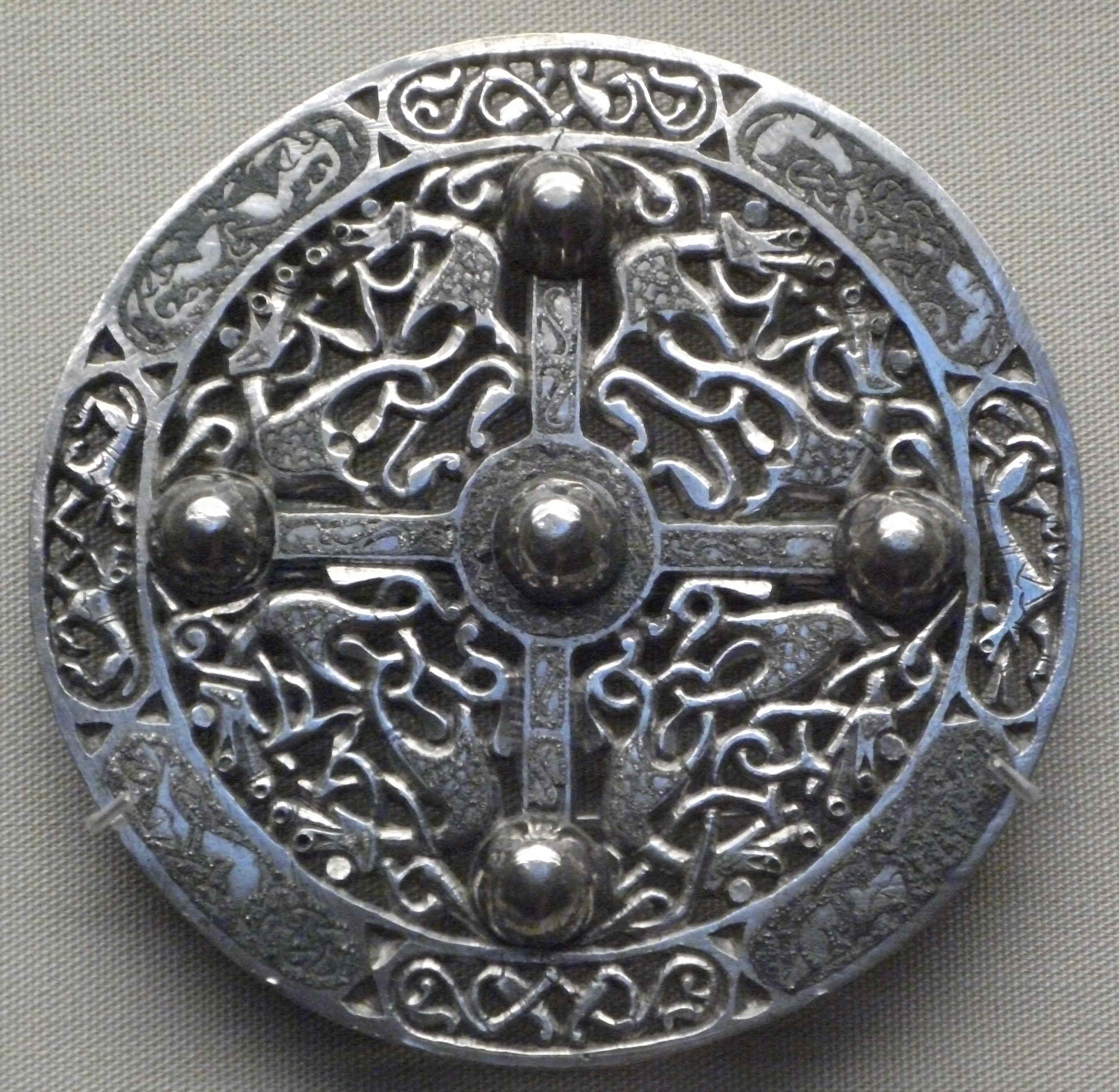
Openwork disc, Pentney hoard

==== Openwork disc ====
The openwork disc consists of a metal ring with an openwork design. These delicate brooches were usually made in copper alloy, although the most famous examples, the Pentney Hoard brooches were cast in silver. They are commonly found in the Midlands and date from the early sixth century. The delicate brooches were commonly worn in pairs on the shoulders.

The most important collection of openwork brooches was found by a gravedigger in a Pentney, Norfolk churchyard in 1978. The six brooch treasure, later named the Pentney Hoard, is now in the British Museum. It is believed that five of the six the brooches date to the ninth century and one brooch was probably made in the tenth century. The largest brooch's size and several bosses (raised ornaments) are similar in style to brooches of the later ninth and tenth centuries. Another well-known openwork example is the silver and niello Strickland Brooch, which also dates to the ninth century.

=== Other shaped brooches ===
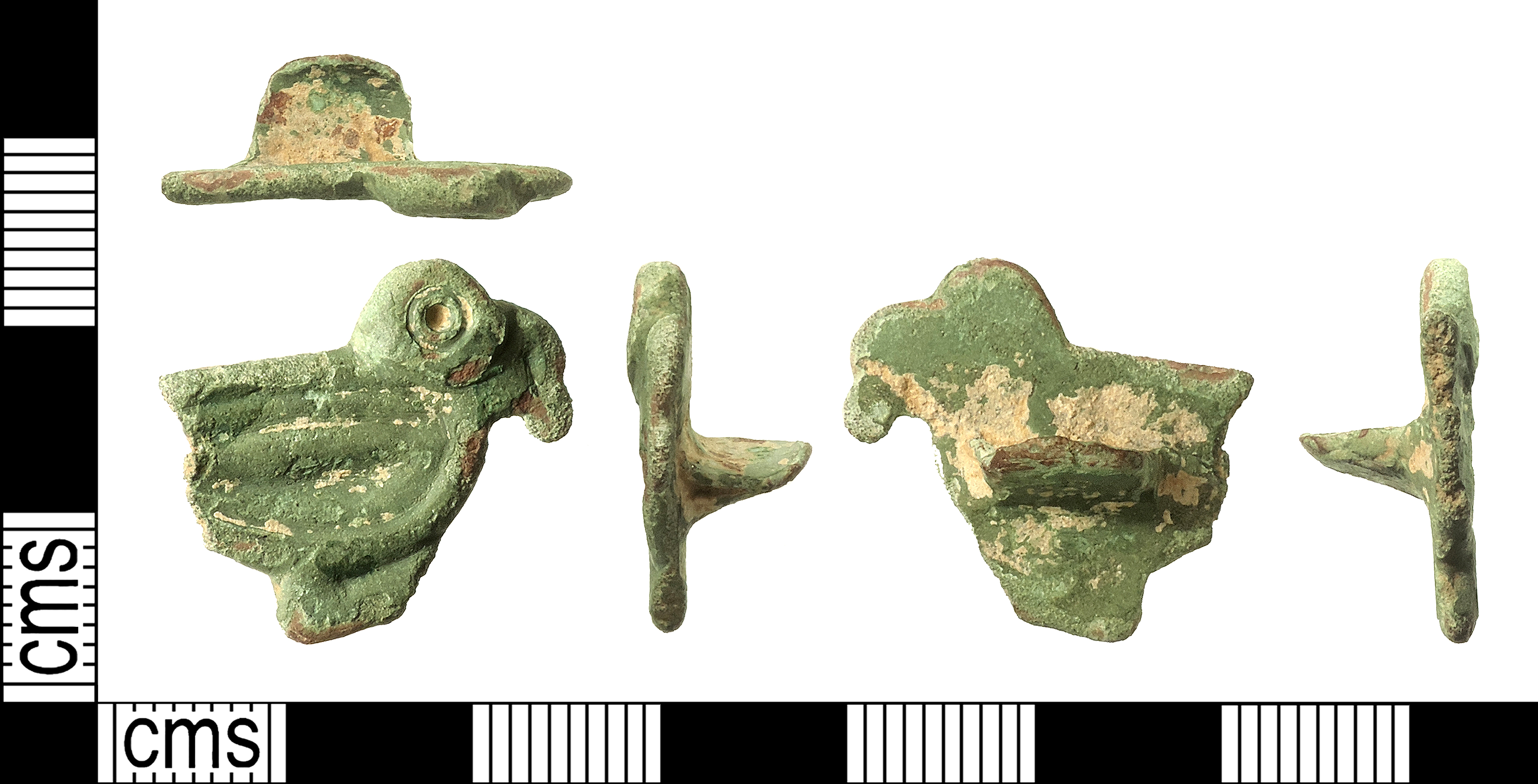
Bird-shaped brooch

Brooches that do not fall into the circular or long category were uncommon in Early Anglo-Saxon England. Of these brooches, the bird or S-shaped were the most popular. Bird shaped brooches are generally found in the Kent area. Artesans from Kent created their own distinct style of bird brooch. The chunky European bird that faced right became a slender English bird brooch that faced left when made in southern England. The Anglo-Saxon bird brooches date from 500 to 500AD in England.

The S-shaped brooches migrated from Continental Europe and can be found throughout Anglo-Saxon England and date from 450—550AD.

== Middle to Late Anglo-Saxon brooches ==
Brooch styles were predominantly circular by the middle to late Anglo-Saxon era. The circular forms can be divided into enamelled and non-enamelled styles. Ansate brooches, traditional brooches from Europe migrated to England and became fashionable in the late Anglo-Saxon period. Safety-pin brooches, more common in the early Anglo-Saxon period, became less fashionable by the seventh century. The safety-pin evolved into the strip brooch.

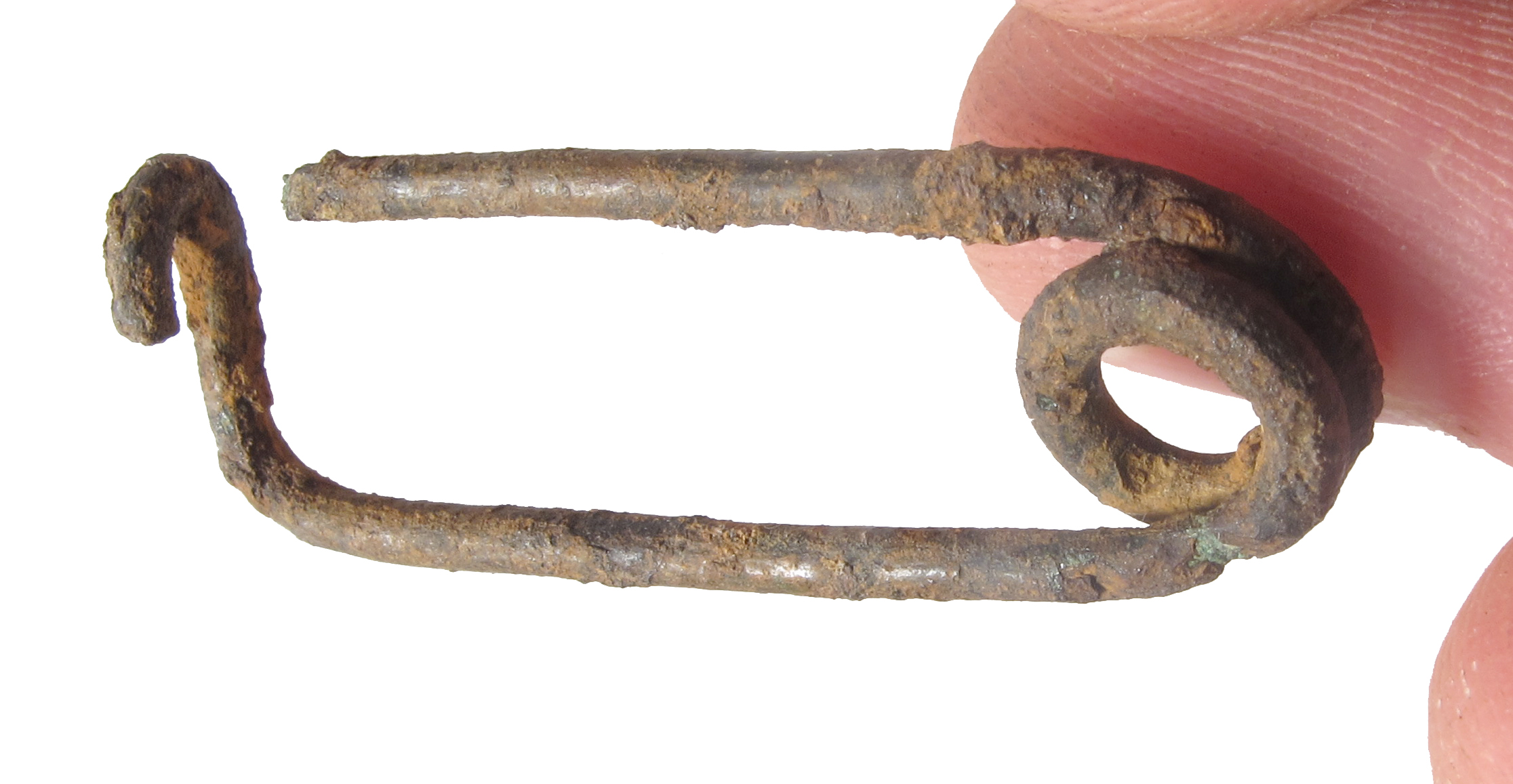
Safety pin brooch

=== Safety pin ===
Safety-pins are fairly uncommon in the seventh century. Made in silver or copper alloy, these simple clothing fasteners resemble modern day safety-pins. A single piece of wire is coiled at the top of the brooch and forms the spring to the pin. Beginning in the eighth century, this form of brooch evolved into the strip brooch.

=== Strip ===
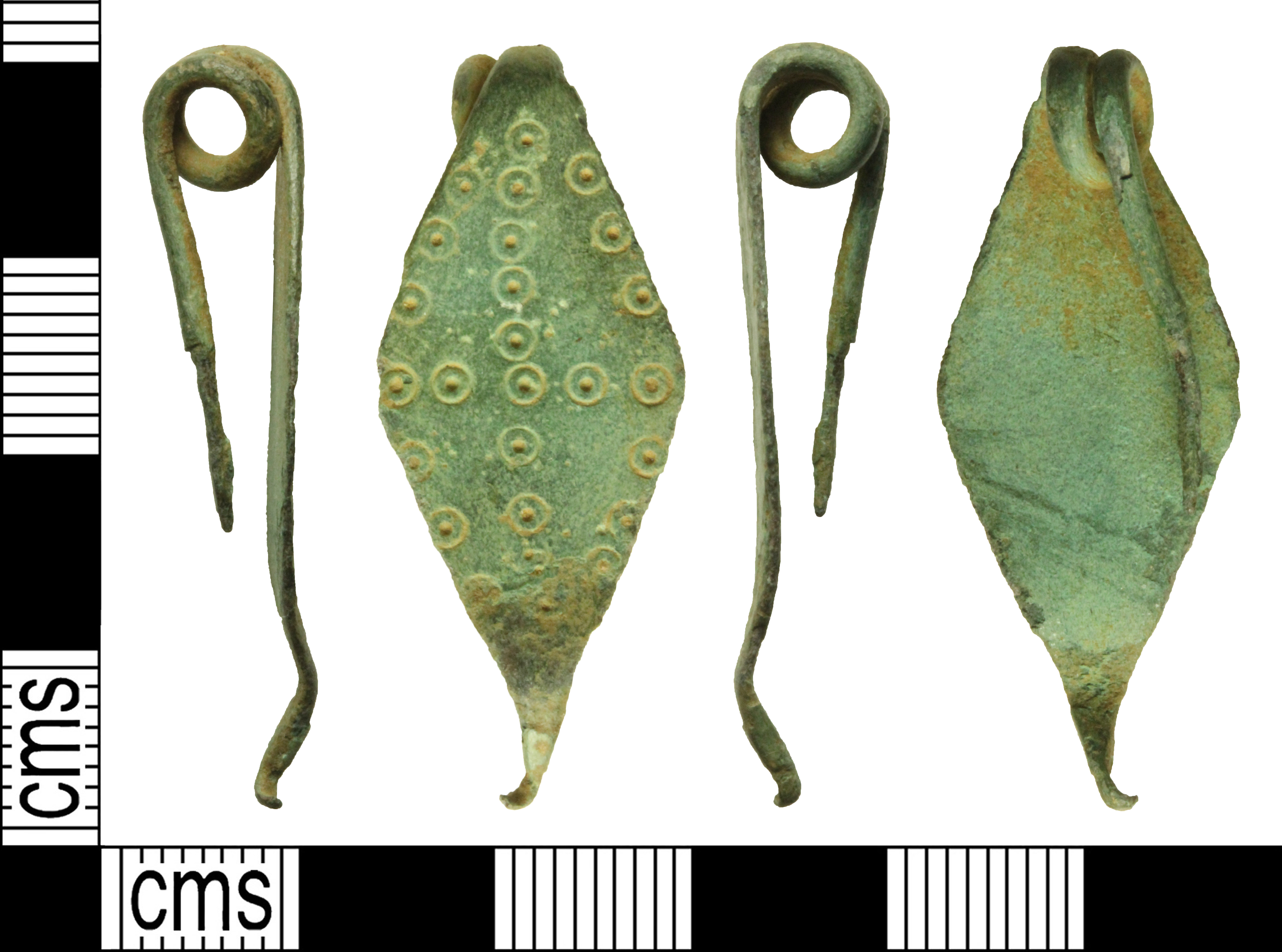
Lozengiform strip brooch

A strip brooch is constructed from a single piece of copper alloy. "Strip brooches can be made in one of two ways. Either the brooch is in one piece, with one end extended into a spring and pin and the other bent into a catchplate; or the plate has a separate riveted-on spring, pin and catch plate." These style can be grouped based on the style of the brooch front. One style is similar to a modem safety-pin; another style has a flat and narrow front plate and a third style has a lozenge-form plate.

=== Ansate ===
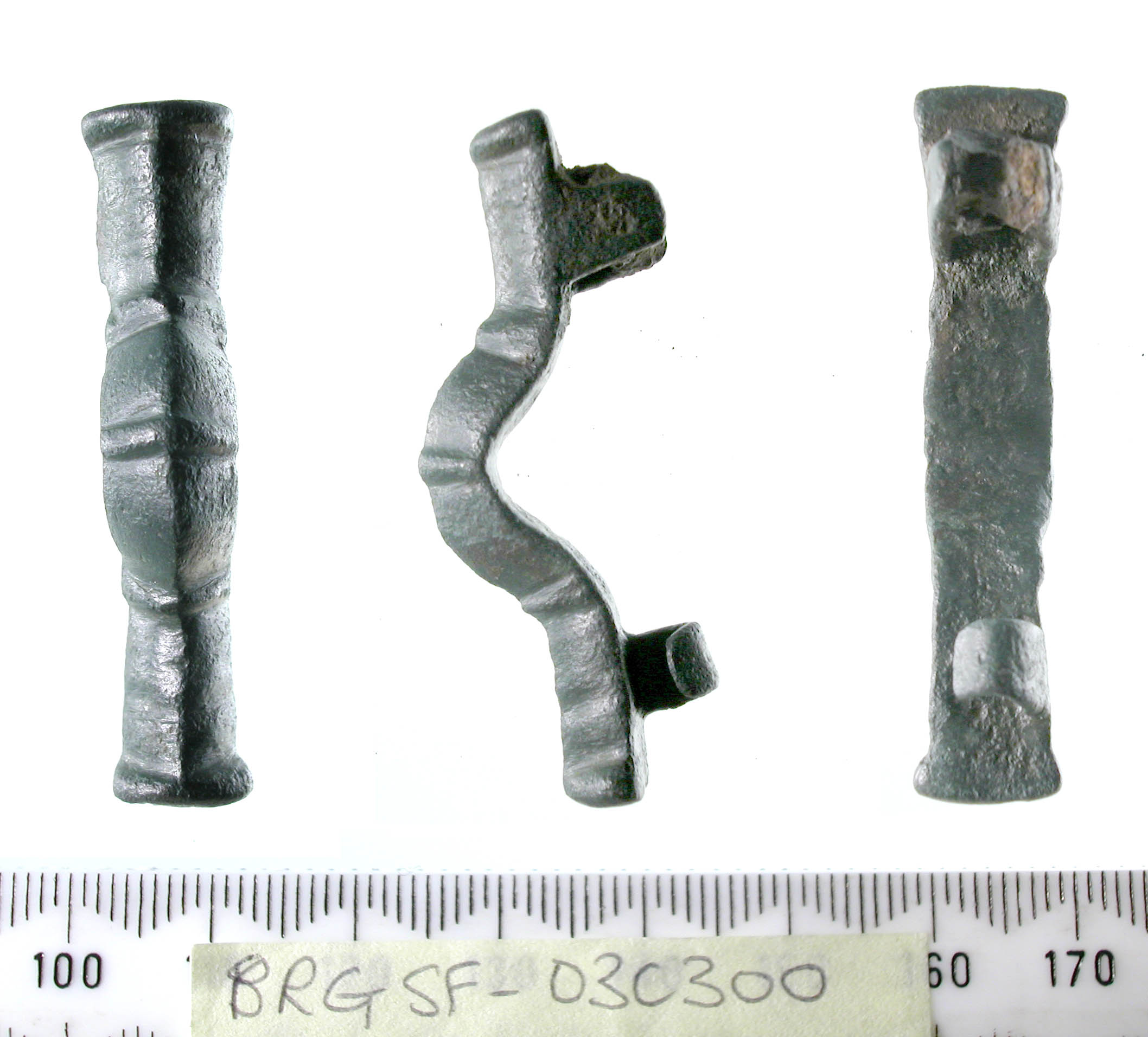
Ansante brooch

Ansante (bow) brooches are equal-armed brooches that originated in Europe. A popular brooch style in Northwestern Europe in the fifth through the seventh centuries, the ansante brooch migrated to England in the seventh century, and was in common use by the tenth century. The brooch is characterized as having two equal-sized terminals with a curved (bow) section in the middle. They are small brooches, typically measuring between 30-50mm in diameter. Most brooches are made in copper alloy.

The ansante brooch is probably the least studied brooch of Anglo-Saxon England. This traditionally styled brooch was once considered by scholars to be a rare European jewellery item, imported to England during the Anglo-Saxon era. With the rise of metal detecting over the last thirty years, the creation of the Portable Antiquities Scheme in 1997, and the addition of a considerable number of brooch artefacts to the Portable Antiquities Scheme database, these brooches now are considered a common brooch style of the mid to late Anglo-Saxon England.

=== Circular ===
The circular brooch is the primary brooch type from the seventh through the eleventh centuries. The circular brooches of this time period can divided into enamelled and non-enamelled types. There are many outstanding brooches created in the ninth through the eleventh centuries. A few of these elaborate brooches include the Strickland Brooch, the Fuller Brooch and the brooches of the Pentney Hoard.

==== Enamelled ====
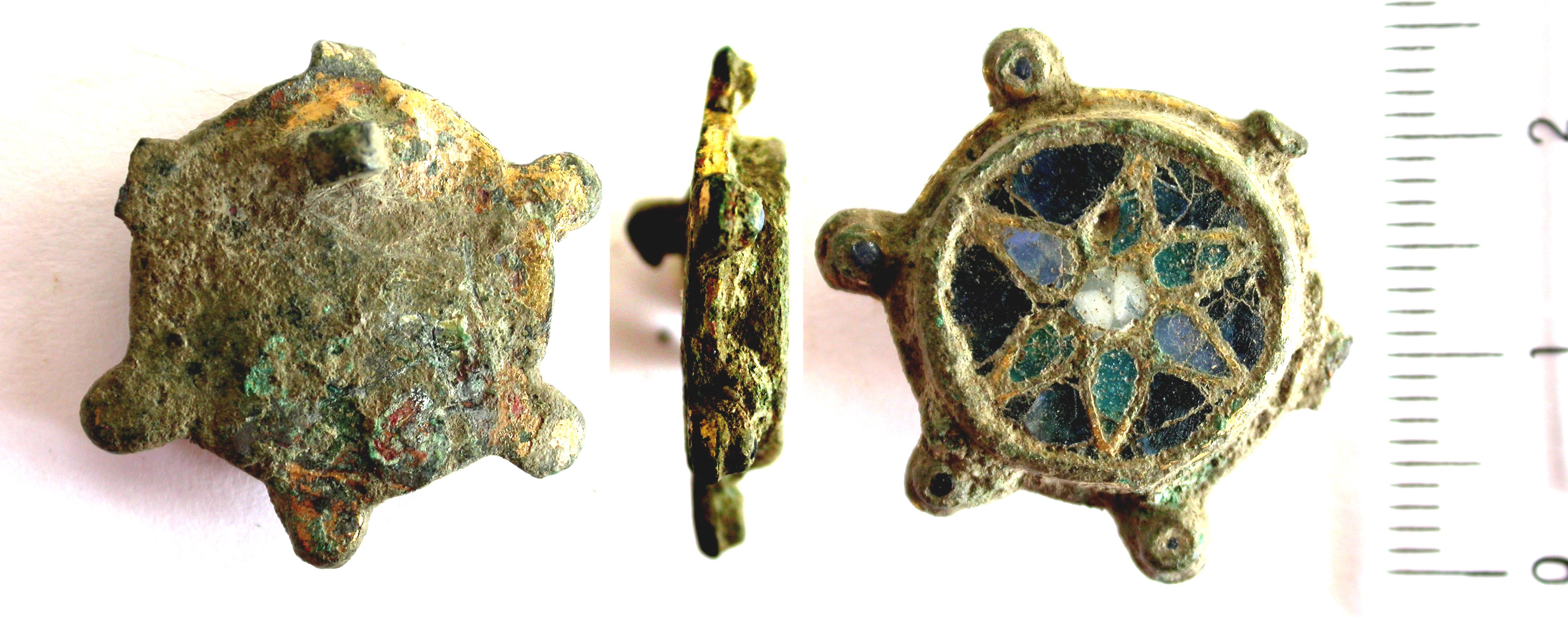
Cloisonné enamelled disc brooch

Enamelling is the process of using extremely high heat to fuse glass onto a prepared metal surface. The technique enables the craftsman to create brightly coloured images. Anglo-Saxon enamelled brooches can be grouped into two main enamelling techniques: champlevé and cloisonné. Champlevé means ‘raised field’ in French and cloisonné translates to 'partitioned'. The champlevé process requires the casting of shallow sunken cells into the body of the metal, and then the cells are filled with enamel. Cloisonné means ‘partitioned’, and this process involves creating cells by soldering vertical cell walls to a disc backplate.

Anglo-Saxon craftsmen used a variety of enamelling techniques, with champlevé enamelling being the most common. The three most popular enamelled brooch styles of this period were the enamelled cross, the saint motif, and the cloisonné brooch.

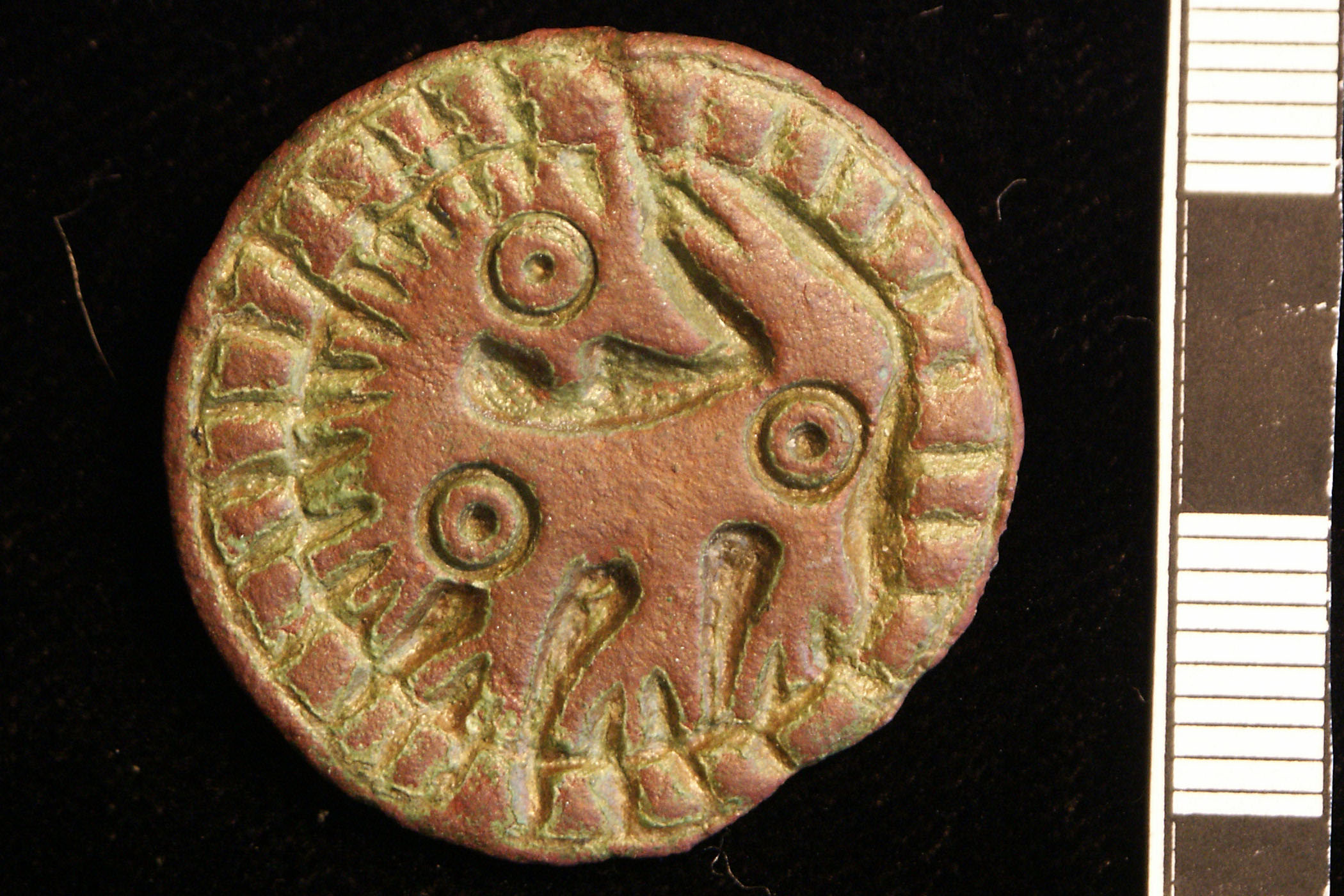
Backward turned animal brooch

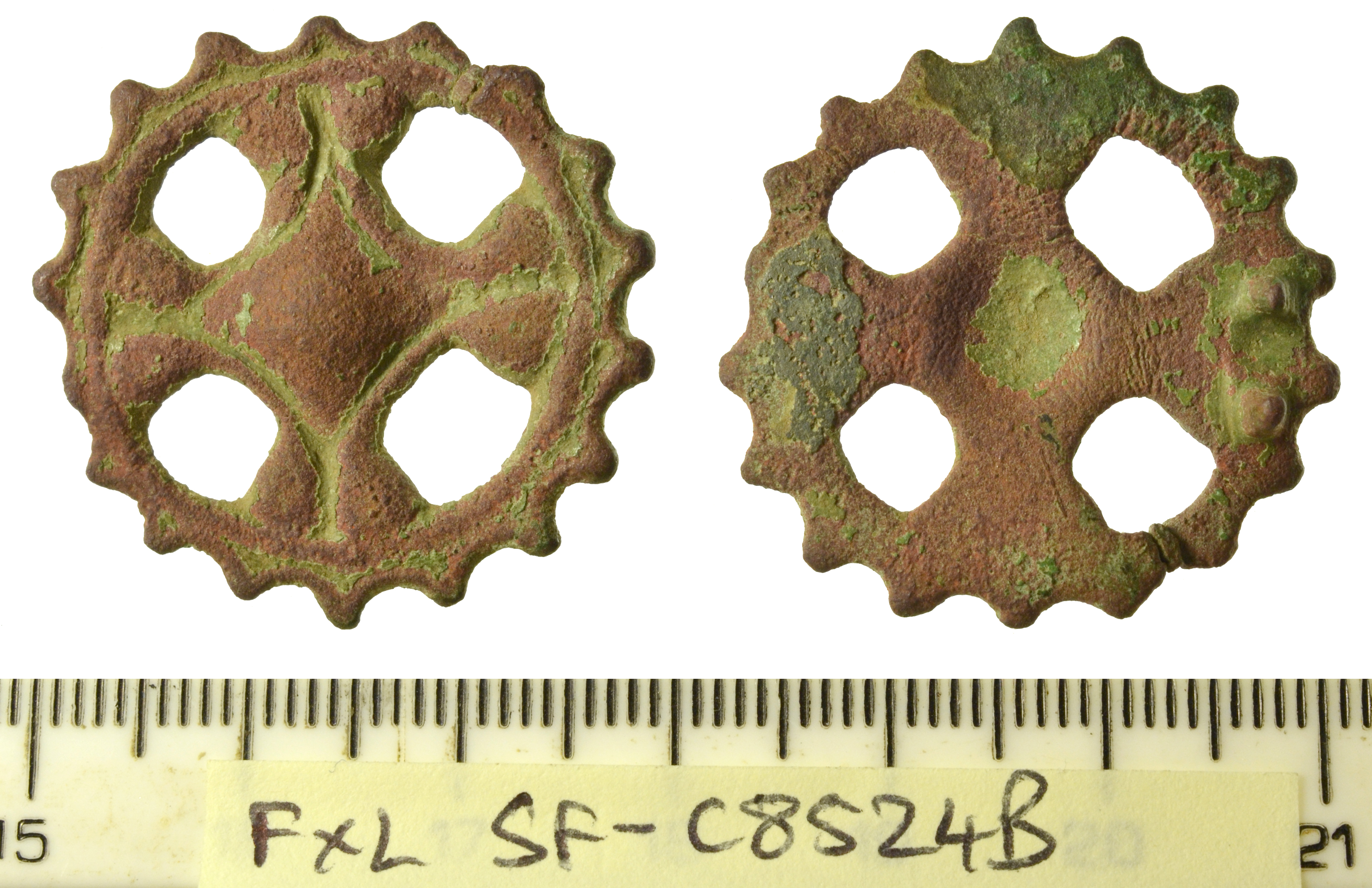
Cogwheel brooch

==== Non-enamelled ====
There are many variations of the non-enamelled circular brooch. The most common styles include: the back-turned animal, coin, cross, concentric circle, stepped and cogwheel forms.

=== Miscellaneous ===
There were a variety of miscellaneous enamelled and non-enamelled brooch styles during this period. The most common were the rectangular, bird-shaped, ottonian and cross-shape styles. Most of the rectangular brooches found in England are non-enamelled, and can be grouped into those with straight sides and those with convex sides. Ottonian brooches were complex, three dimensional brooches imported from Europe. Bird shaped brooches of this era generally consist of a raised wing, fan shaped tail, and crested head. They also display two legs with claws that are joined together.

== Gallery ==
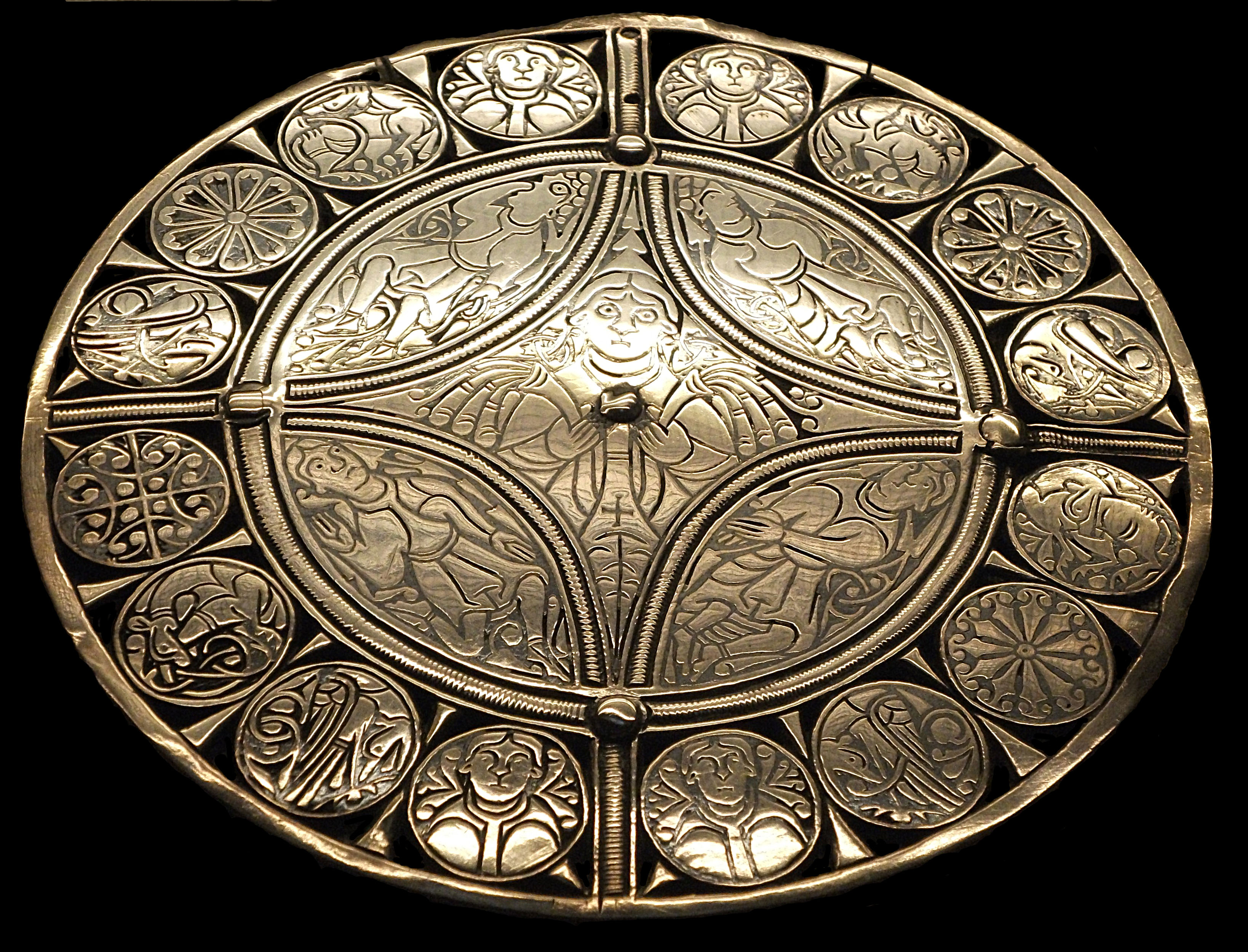
Fuller brooch

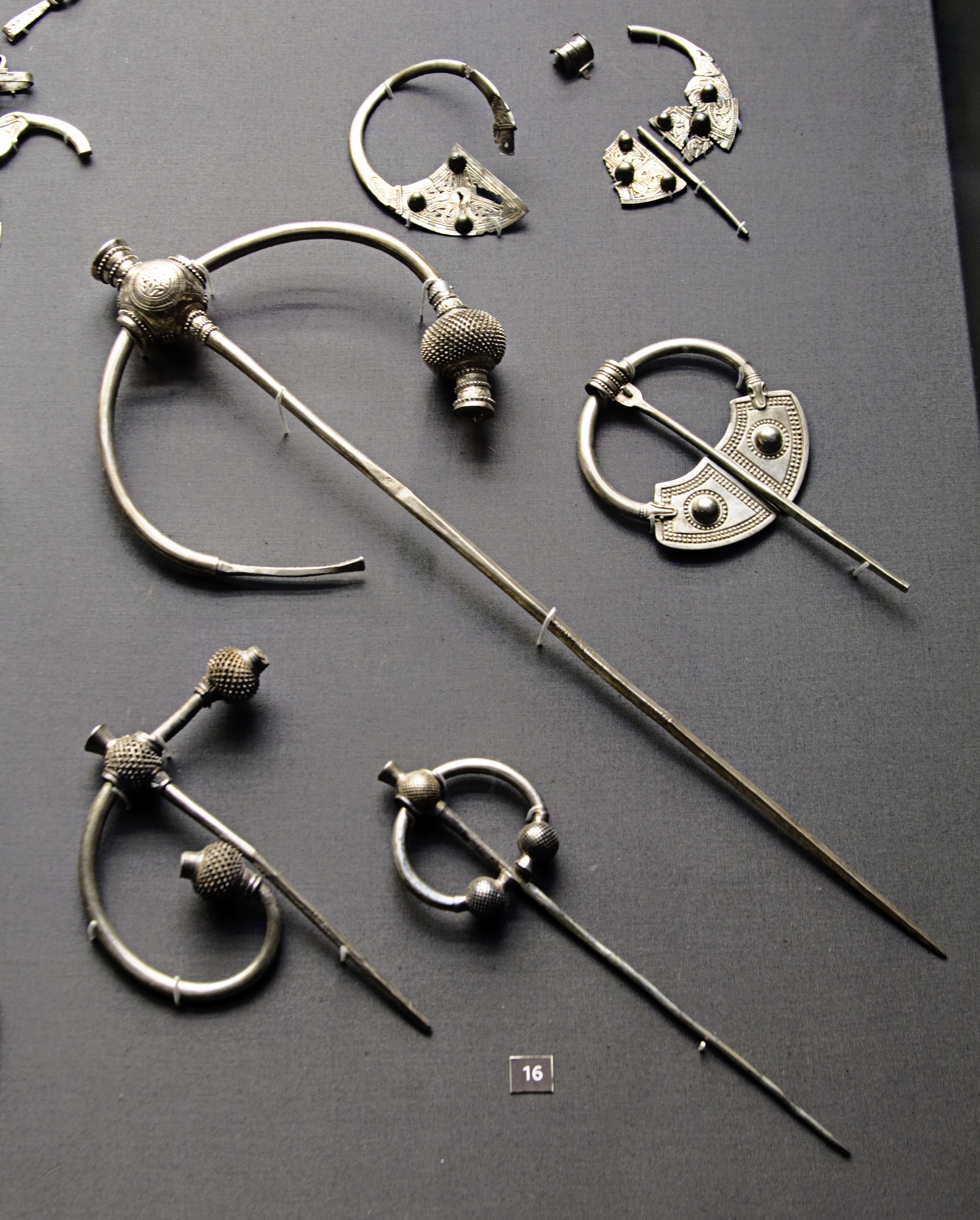
Penrith Hoard brooches, Irish Viking style

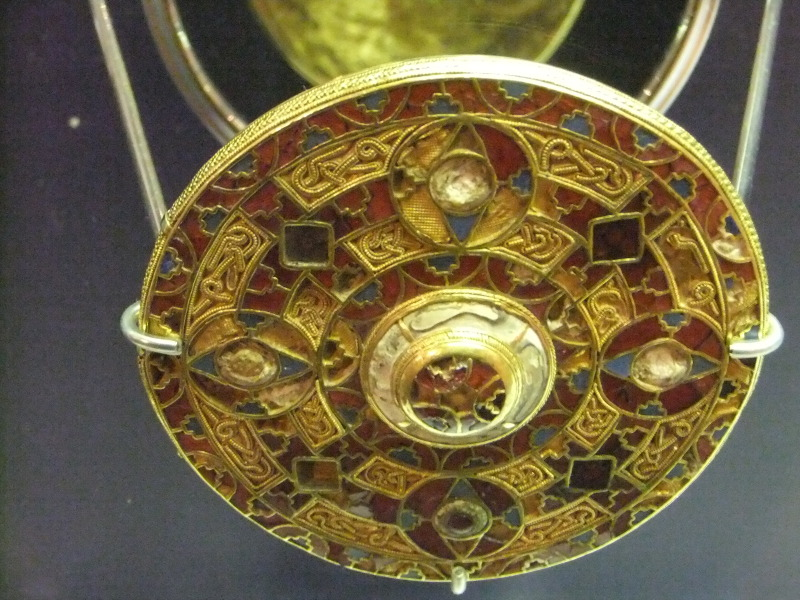
Kingston Brooch

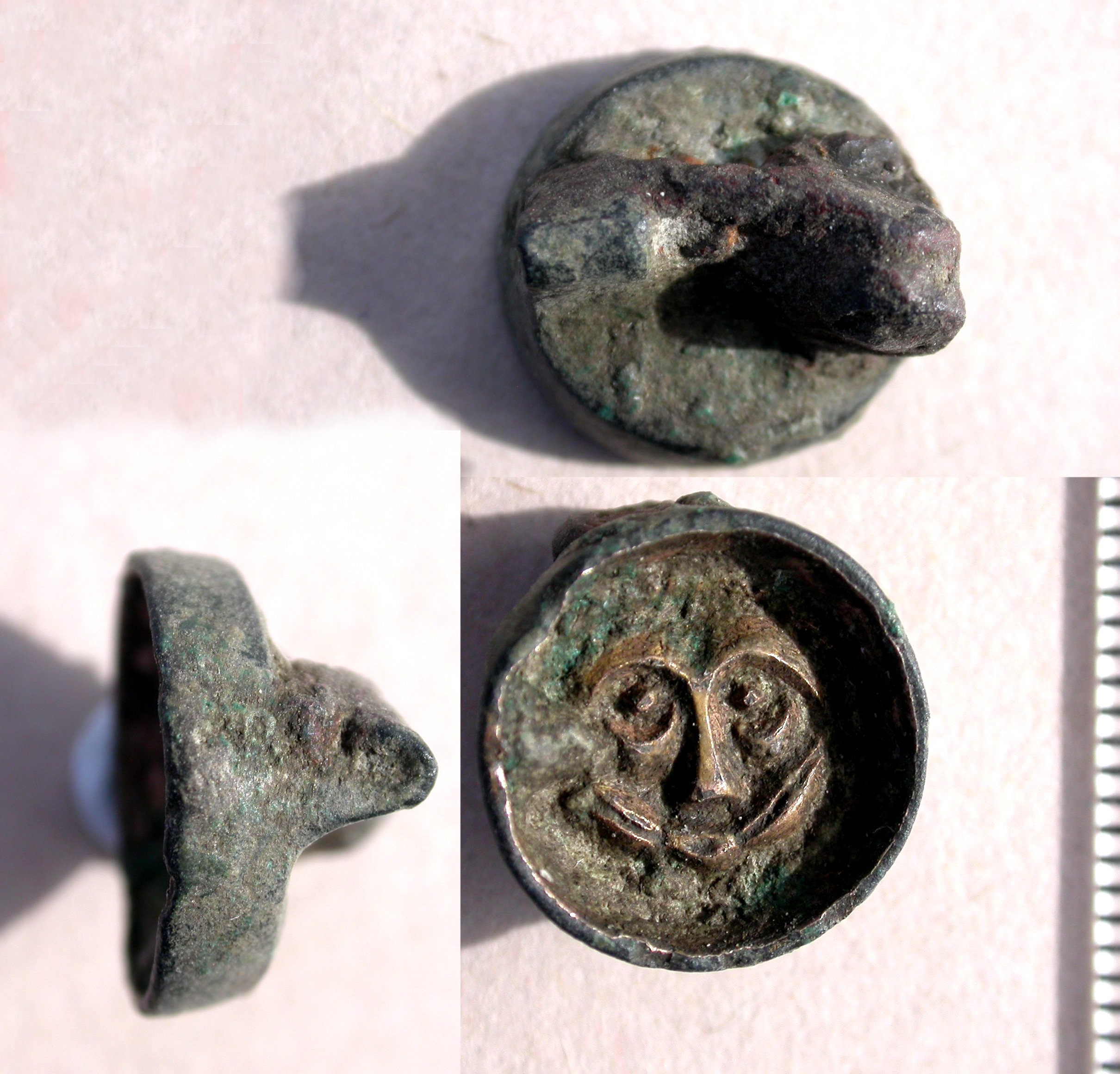
Button brooch

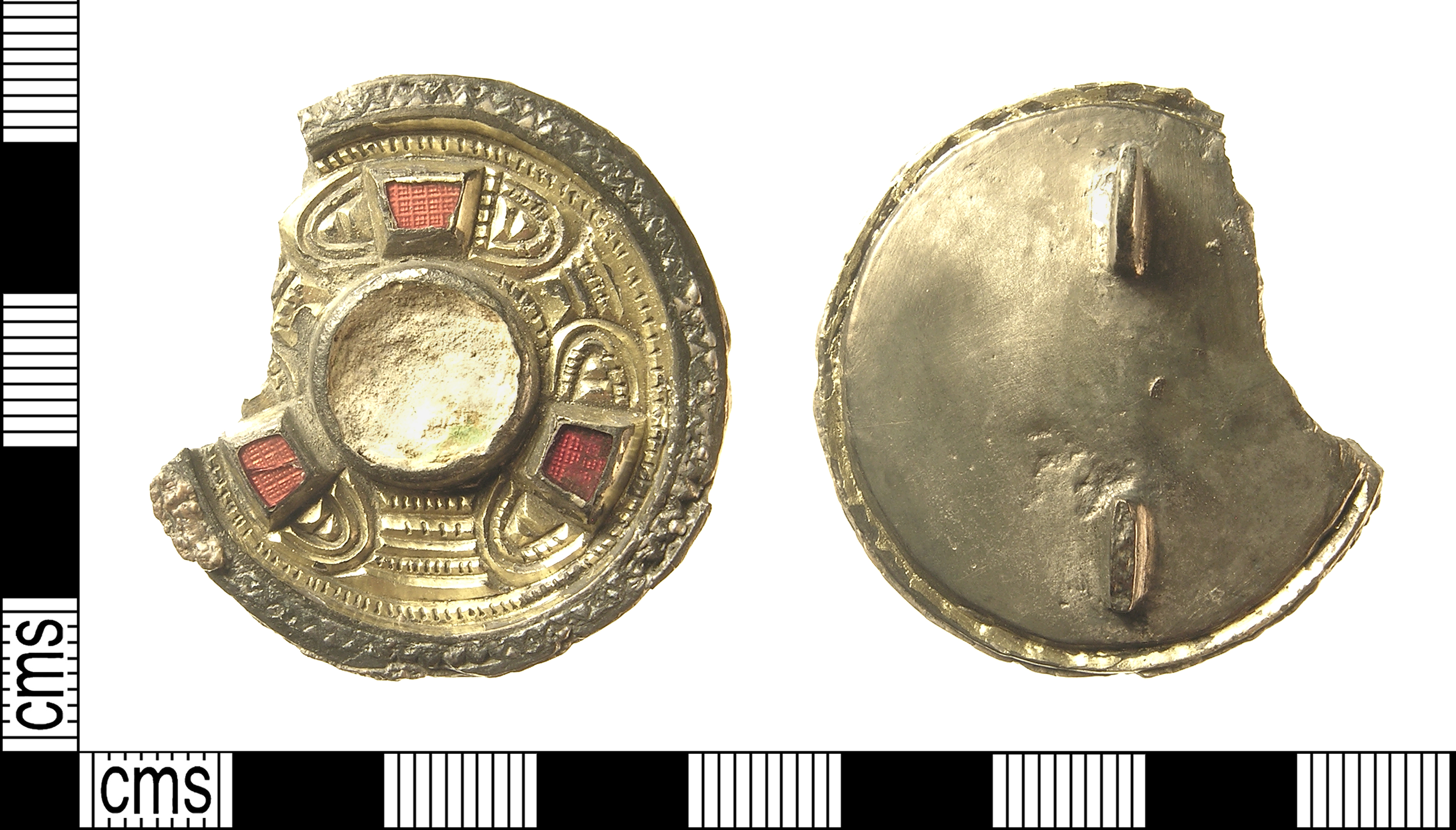
Kentish Keystone brooch

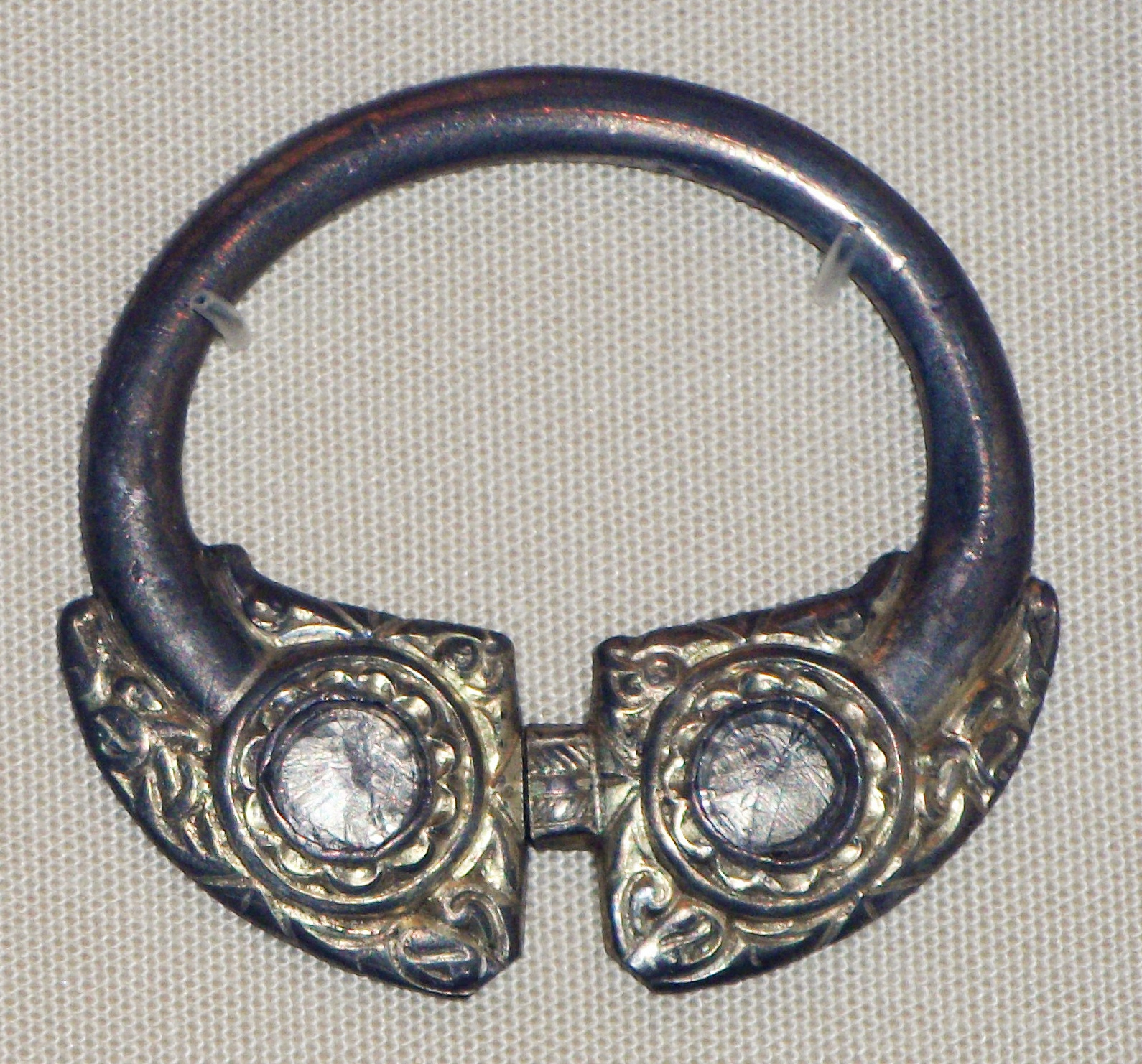
Penannular brooch (not Anglo-Saxon)

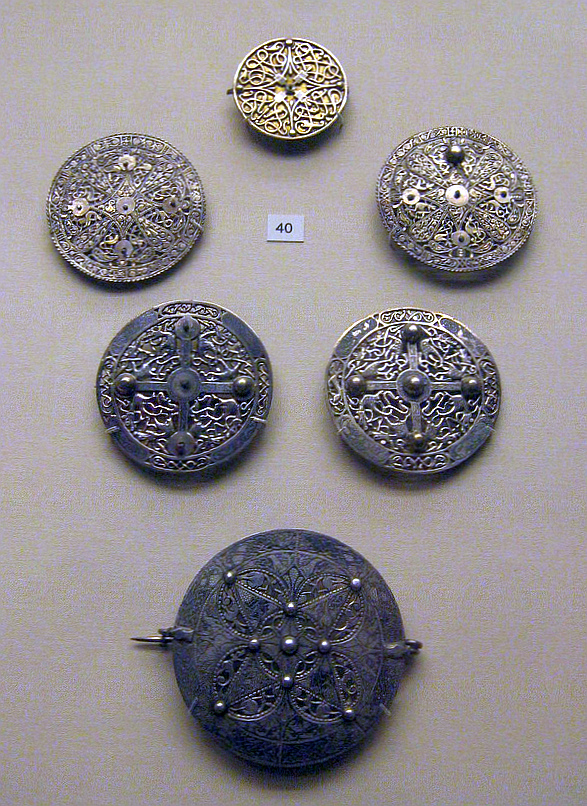
Openwork silver disk brooches

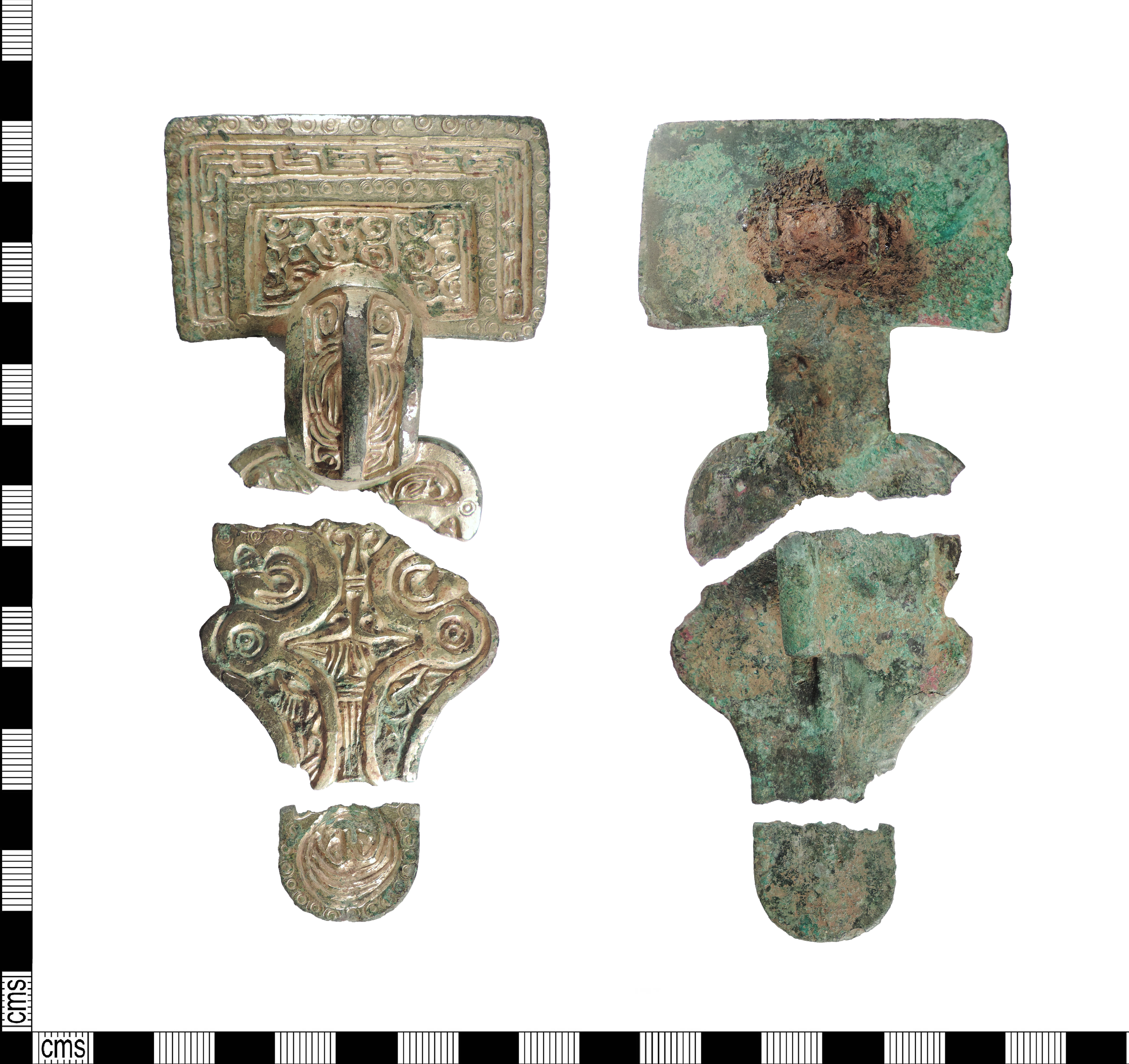
Great square-headed brooch

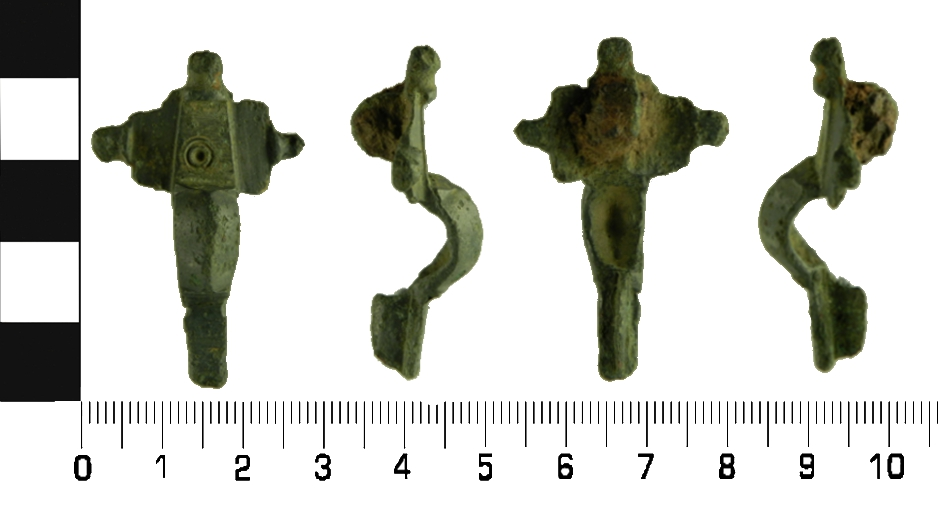
Cruciform brooch

== See also ==
- Brooch
- Anglo Saxon art
- Migration period art
- Strickland Brooch
- Fuller Brooch
- Hunterston Brooch
- Celtic brooch
- Quoit brooch
- Ædwen's brooch
