= Anglo-Saxon art =

English art of the Anglo-Saxon period

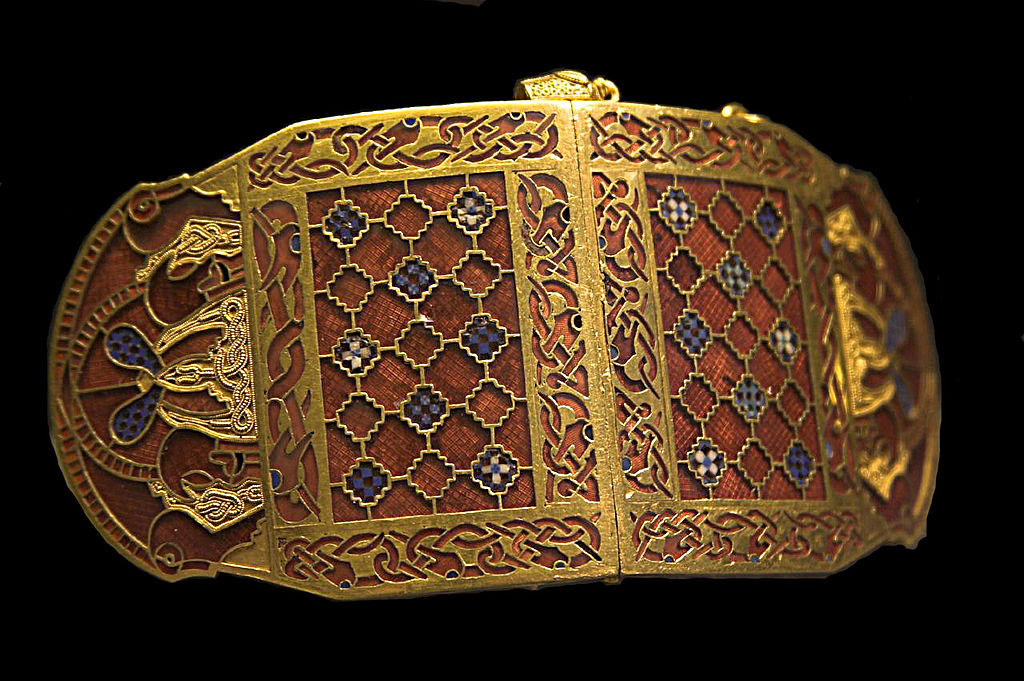
Shoulder-clasps from Sutton Hoo, early 7th century

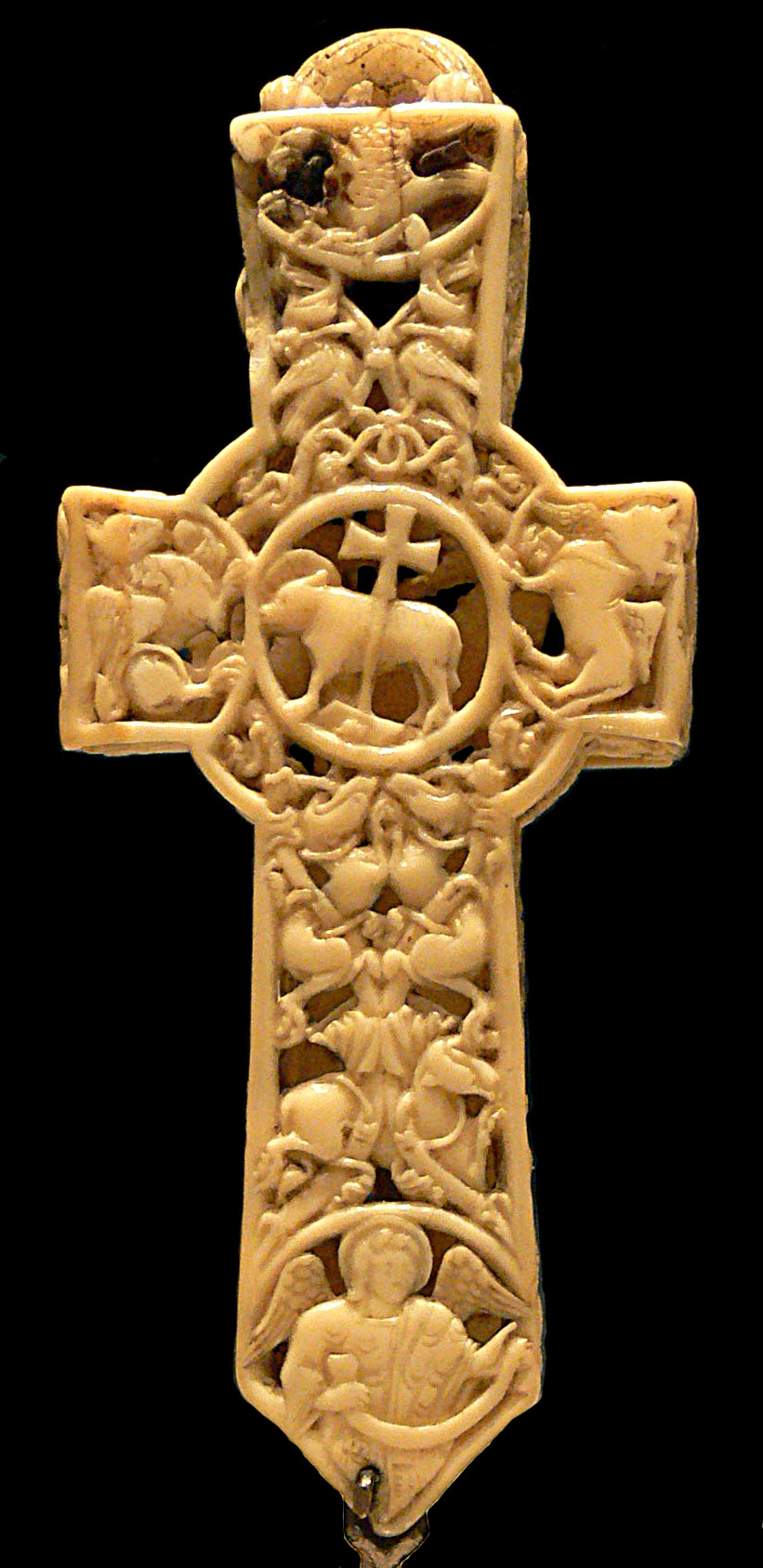
11th century walrus ivory cross reliquary (Victoria & Albert Museum)

Anglo-Saxon art covers art produced within the Anglo-Saxon period of English history, beginning with the Migration period style that the Anglo-Saxons brought with them from the continent in the 5th century, and ending in 1066 with the Norman Conquest of England, whose sophisticated art was influential in much of northern Europe. The two periods of outstanding achievement were the 7th and 8th centuries, with the metalwork and jewellery from Sutton Hoo and a series of magnificent illuminated manuscripts, and the final period after about 950, when there was a revival of English culture after the end of the Viking invasions. By the time of the Conquest the move to the Romanesque style is nearly complete. The important artistic centres, in so far as these can be established, were concentrated in the extremities of England, in Northumbria, especially in the early period, and Wessex and Kent near the south coast.

Anglo-Saxon art survives mostly in illuminated manuscripts, Anglo-Saxon architecture, a number of very fine ivory carvings, and some works in metal and other materials. Opus Anglicanum ("English work") was already recognised as the finest embroidery in Europe, although only a few pieces from the Anglo-Saxon period remain – the Bayeux Tapestry is a rather different sort of embroidery, on a far larger scale. As in most of Europe at the time, metalwork was the most highly regarded form of art by the Anglo-Saxons, but hardly any survives – there was enormous plundering of Anglo-Saxon churches, monasteries and the possessions of the dispossessed nobility by the new Norman rulers in their first decades, as well as the Norsemen before them, and the English Reformation after them, and most survivals were once on the continent. Anglo-Saxon taste favoured brightness and colour, and an effort of the imagination is often needed to see the excavated and worn remains that survive as they once were.

Perhaps the best known piece of Anglo-Saxon art is the Bayeux Tapestry which was commissioned by a Norman patron from English artists working in the traditional Anglo-Saxon style. Anglo-Saxon artists also worked in fresco, stone, ivory and whalebone (notably the Franks Casket), metalwork (for example the Fuller brooch), glass and enamel, many examples of which have been recovered through archaeological excavation and some of which have simply been preserved over the centuries, especially in churches on the Continent, as the Vikings, Normans and Reformation iconoclasm between them left virtually nothing in England except for books and archaeological finds.

== Overview ==
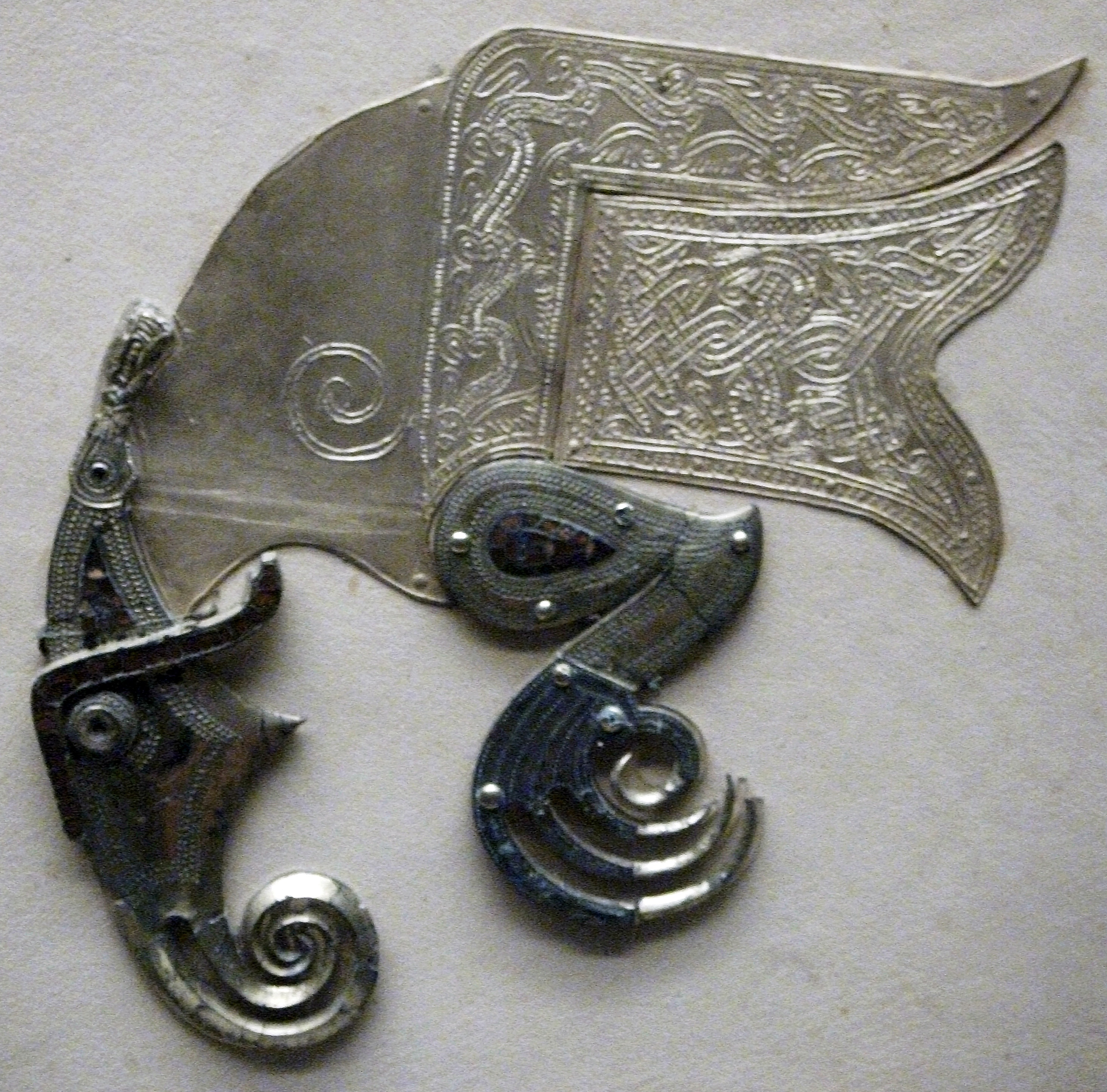
Bird from the Sutton Hoo shield (part replica)

Metalwork is almost the only form in which the earliest Anglo-Saxon art has survived, mostly in Germanic-style jewellery (including fittings for clothes and weapons) which was, before the Christianisation of Anglo-Saxon England, commonly placed in burials. After the conversion, which took most of the 7th century, the fusion of Germanic Anglo-Saxon, Celtic and Late Antique techniques and motifs, together with the requirement for books, created the Hiberno-Saxon style, or Insular art, which is also seen in illuminated manuscripts and some carved stone and ivory, probably mostly drawing from decorative metalwork motifs, and with further influences from the British Celts of the west and the Franks.

The Kingdom of Northumbria in the far north of England was the crucible of Insular style in Britain, at centres such as Lindisfarne, founded c. 635 as an offshoot of the Irish monastery on Iona, and Monkwearmouth-Jarrow Abbey (674) which looked to the continent. At about the same time as the Insular Lindisfarne Gospels was being made in the early 8th century, the Vespasian Psalter from Canterbury in the far south, which the missionaries from Rome had made their headquarters, shows a wholly different, classically based art. These two styles mixed and developed together and by the following century the resulting Anglo-Saxon style had reached maturity.

However Anglo-Saxon society was massively disrupted in the 9th century, especially the later half, by the Viking invasions, and the number of significant objects surviving falls considerably, and their dating becomes even vaguer than of those from a century before. Most monasteries in the north were closed for decades, if not forever, and after the Canterbury Bible of before 850, perhaps well before, "no major illuminated manuscript is known until well on into the tenth century". King Alfred (r. 871–899) held the Vikings back to a line running diagonally across the middle of England, above which they settled in the Danelaw, and were gradually integrated into what was now a unified Anglo-Saxon kingdom.

The final phase of Anglo-Saxon art is known as the Winchester School or style, named for the main centre of the style. Though it was produced in many centres in the south of England (and perhaps the Midlands also), the style originated in Winchester, driven by royal patronage from King Alfred (r. 871–899) and subsequent kings. Elements of this begin to be seen from around 900, but the first major manuscripts only appear around the 930s. The style combined influences from the continental art of the Holy Roman Empire with elements of older English art, and some particular elements including a nervous agitated style of drapery, sometimes matched by figures, especially in line drawings, which are the only images in many manuscripts, and were to remain especially prominent in medieval English art.

== Illuminated manuscripts ==
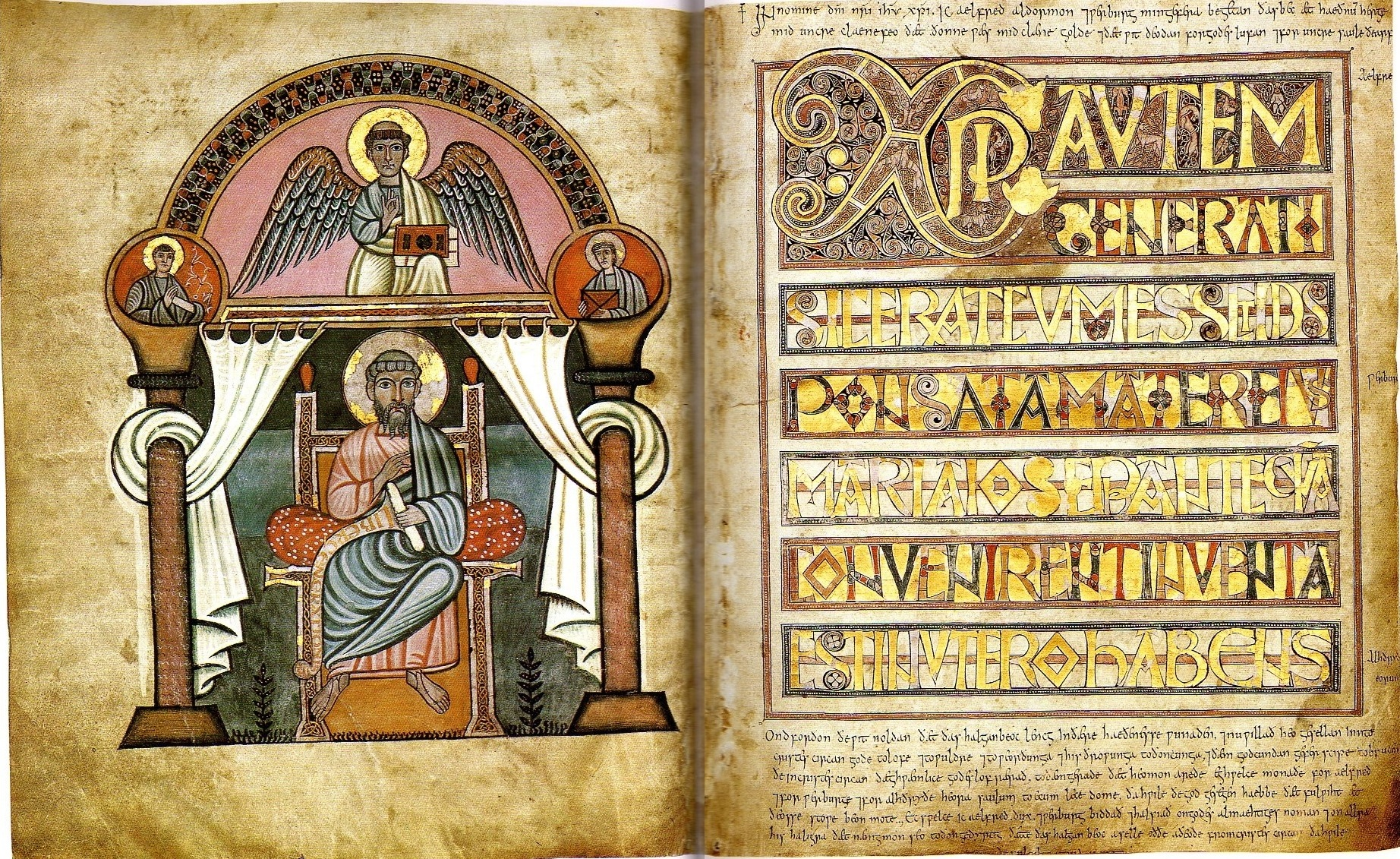
The evangelist portrait and Incipit to Matthew from the Stockholm Codex Aureus, one of the "Tiberius group", show the Northumbrian Insular and classicising continental styles that combined and competed in early Anglo-Saxon manuscripts. It was probably made in Canterbury.

Early Anglo-Saxon manuscript illumination forms part of Insular art, a combination of influences from Mediterranean, Celtic and Germanic styles that arose when the Anglo-Saxons encountered Irish missionary activity in Northumbria, at Lindisfarne and Iona in particular. At the same time the Gregorian mission from Rome and its successors imported continental manuscripts like the Italian St. Augustine Gospels, and for a considerable period the two styles appear mixed in a variety of proportions in Anglo-Saxon manuscripts.

In the Lindisfarne Gospels, of around 700–715, there are carpet pages and Insular initials of unprecedented complexity and sophistication, but the evangelist portraits, clearly following Italian models, greatly simplify them, misunderstand some details of the setting, and give them a border with interlace corners. The portrait of St Matthew is based on the same Italian model, or one extremely similar, used for the figure of Ezra that is one of the two large miniatures in the Codex Amiatinus (before 716), but the style there is very different; a far more illusionistic treatment, and an "attempt to introduce a pure Mediterranean style into Anglo-Saxon England", which failed, as "perhaps too advanced", leaving these images apparently as the only evidence.

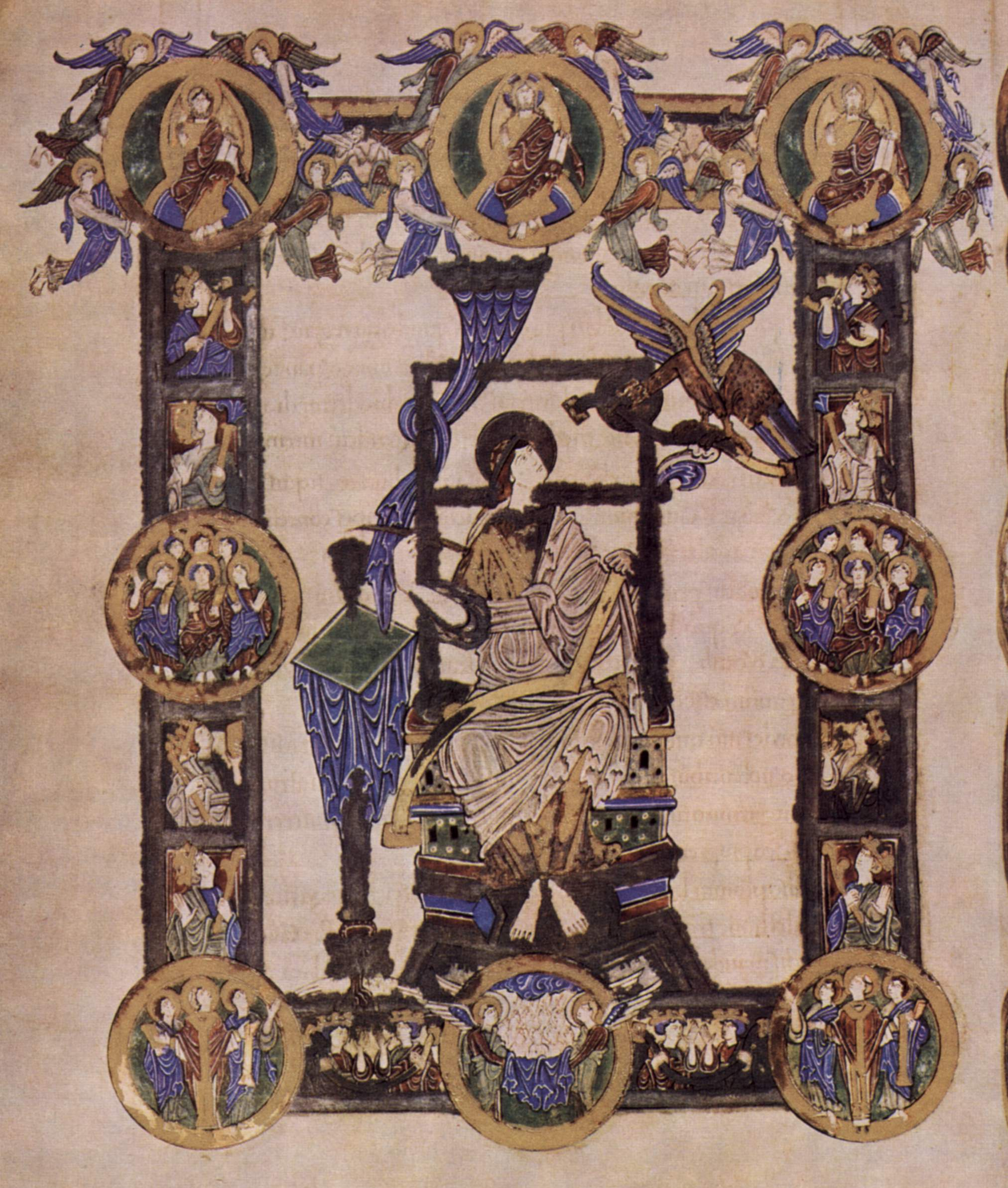
Evangelist portrait from the Grimbald Gospels, early 11th century, in the late Winchester style.

A different mixture is seen in the opening from the Stockholm Codex Aureus (mid-8th century, above left) where the evangelist portrait to the left is in a consistent adaptation of Italian style, probably closely following some lost model, though adding interlace to the chair frame, while the text page to the right is mainly in Insular style, especially in the first line, with its vigorous Celtic spirals and interlace. The following lines revert to a quieter style more typical of Frankish manuscripts of the period. Yet the same artist almost certainly produced both pages, and is very confident in both styles; the evangelist portrait of John includes roundels with Celtic spiral decoration probably drawn from the enamelled escutcheons of hanging bowls.

This is one of the so-called "Tiberius group" of manuscripts, which leant towards the Italian style, and appear to be associated with Kent, or perhaps the kingdom of Mercia in the heyday of the Mercian Supremacy. It is, in the usual chronology, the last English manuscript in which "developed trumpet spiral patterns" are found.

The 9th century, especially the latter half, has very few major survivals made in England, but was a period when Insular and Anglo-Saxon influence on Carolingian manuscripts was at its height, from scriptoria such as those at the Anglo-Saxon mission's foundation at Echternach Abbey (though the important Echternach Gospels were created in Northumbria), and the major monastery at Tours, where Alcuin of York was followed by another Anglo-Saxon abbot, between them covering the period from 796 to 834. Although Tours' own library was destroyed by Norsemen, over 60 9th century illuminated manuscripts from the scriptorium survive, in a style showing many borrowings from English models, especially in initial pages, where Insular influence remained visible in northern France until even the 12th century. The Anglo-Saxon metalwork produced in the Salzburg area of modern Austria has a manuscript counterpart in the "Cutbercht Gospels" in Vienna.

=== 10th century onwards ===
By the 10th century Insular elements were relegated to decorative embellishments in England, as the first phase of the "Winchester style" developed. The first plant ornament, with leaves and grapes, was already seen in an initial in the Leningrad Bede, which can probably be dated to 746. The other large initial in the manuscript is the first historiated initial (one containing a portrait or scene, here Christ or a saint) in the whole of Europe. The classically derived vine or plant scroll was to largely oust interlace as the dominant filler of ornamental spaces in Anglo-Saxon art, just as it did in much of Europe beginning with Carolingian art, though in England animals within the scrolls remained much more common than abroad. For some long time scrolls, especially in metal, bone or ivory, are prone to have an animal head at one end and a plant element at the other.

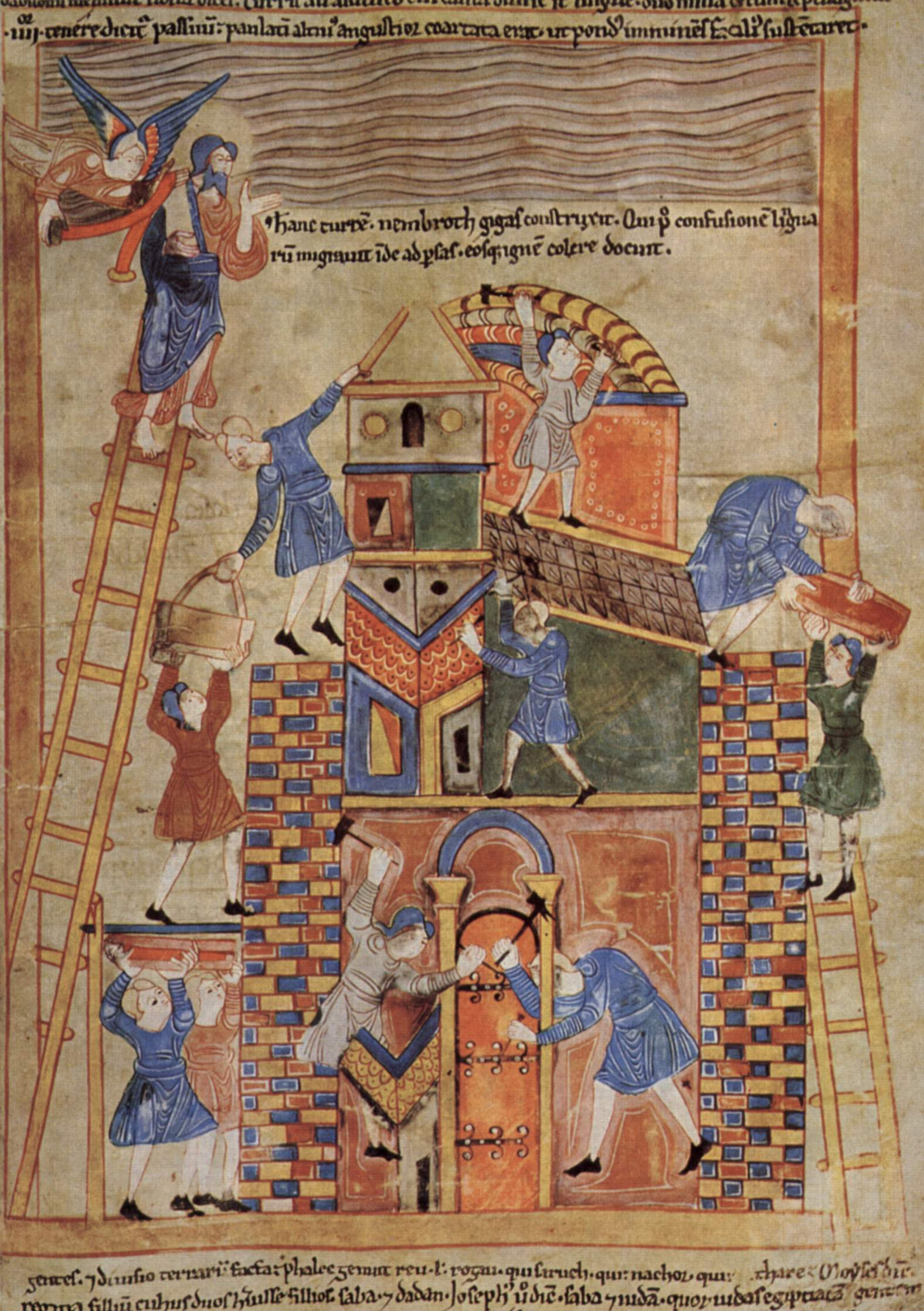
Illustration of the Tower of Babel in the Old English Hexateuch.

All these changes were not restricted to manuscripts, and may not have been driven by manuscript style, but we have a greater number of manuscripts surviving than works in other media, even if in most cases illuminations are restricted to initials and perhaps a few miniatures. Several ambitious projects of illumination are unfinished, such as the Old English Hexateuch, which has some 550 scenes in various stages of completion, giving insight into working methods. The illustrations give Old Testament scenes an entirely contemporary setting and are valuable images of Anglo-Saxon life.

Manuscripts from the Winchester School or style only survive from about the 930s onwards; this coincided with a wave of revival and reform within English monasticism, encouraged by King Æthelstan (r. 924/5-939) and his successors. Æthelstan promoted Dunstan (909–988), a practising illuminator, eventually to Archbishop of Canterbury, and also Æthelwold and the French-trained Norseman Oswald. Illumination in a new style appears in a manuscript of the biographies by Bede of St Cuthbert given by Æthelstan to the monastery in Chester-le-Street about 937. There is a dedication portrait of the king presenting his book to the saint, the two of them standing outside a large church. This is the first real portrait of an English king, and heavily influenced by Carolingian style, with an elegant inhabited acanthus border. However, the initials in the text combine Carolingian elements with animal forms in inventive fashion. Miniatures added in England to the continental Aethelstan Psalter begin to show Anglo-Saxon liveliness in figure drawing in compositions derived from Carolingian and Byzantine models, and over the following decades the distinctive Winchester style with agitated draperies and elaborate acanthus borders develops.

The Benedictional of St. Æthelwold is a masterpiece of the later Winchester style, which drew on Insular, Carolingian, and Byzantine art to make a heavier and more grandiose style, where the broad classicising acanthus foliage sometimes seems over-luxuriant. Anglo-Saxon illustration included many lively pen drawings, on which the Carolingian Utrecht Psalter, in Canterbury from about 1000, was highly influential; the Harley Psalter is a copy of it. The Ramsey Psalter (c. 990) contains pages in both the painted and tinted drawing styles, including the first Beatus initial with a "lion mask", while the Tiberius Psalter, from the last years before the Conquest, uses mainly the tinted. Anglo-Saxon culture was coming into increasing contact with, and exchanging influences with, a wider Latin Mediaeval Europe. Anglo-Saxon drawing had a great influence in Northern France throughout the 11th century, in the so-called "Channel school", and Insular decorative elements such as interlace remained popular into the 12th century in the Franco-Saxon style.

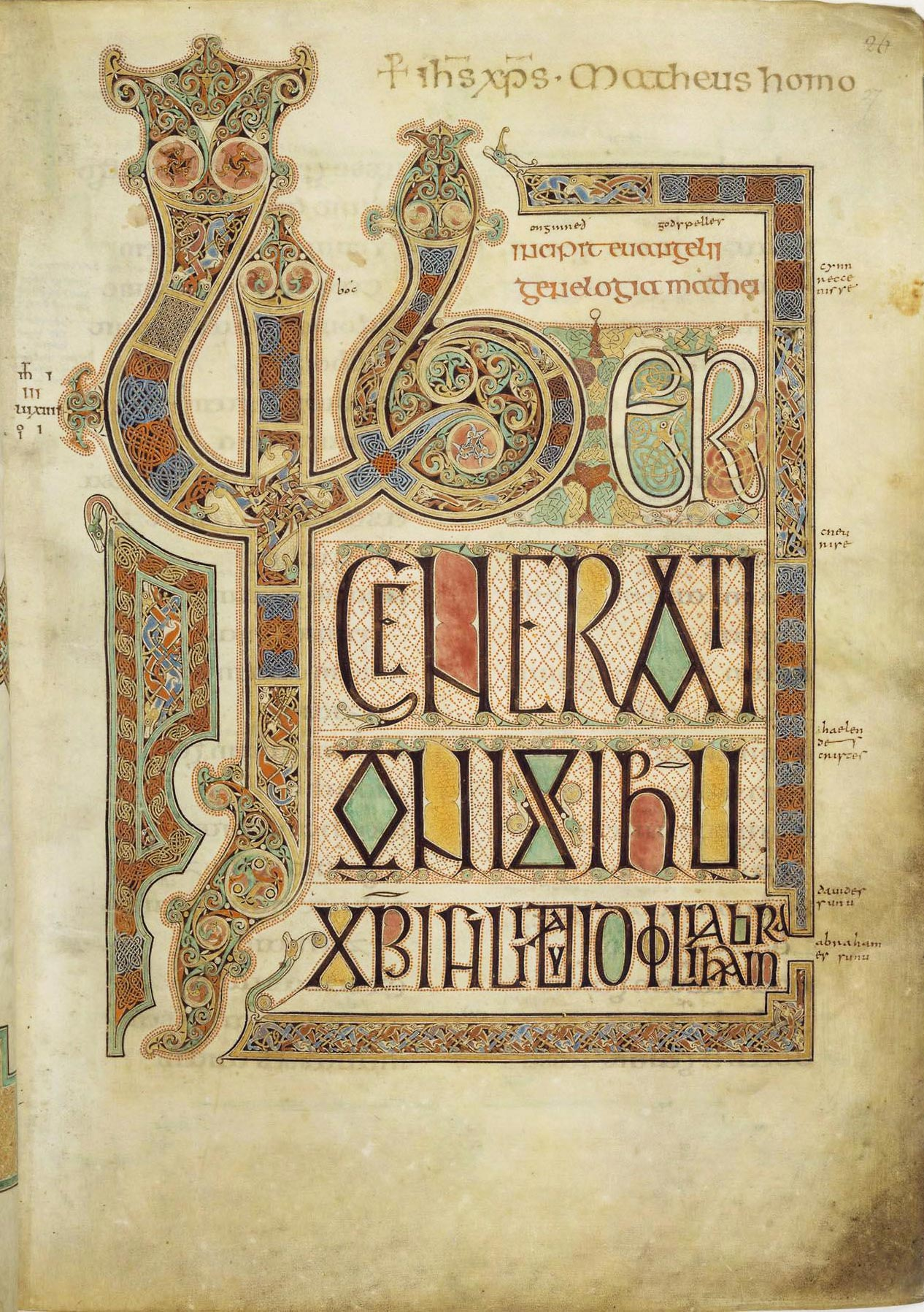
The Incipit to Matthew from the Book of Lindisfarne, an Insular masterpiece

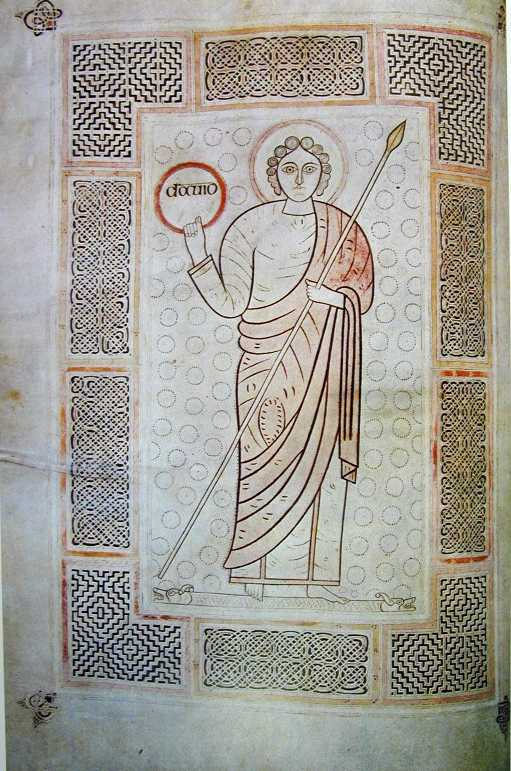
David from the Durham Cassiodorus, a rare non-liturgical illuminated manuscript from the early period.

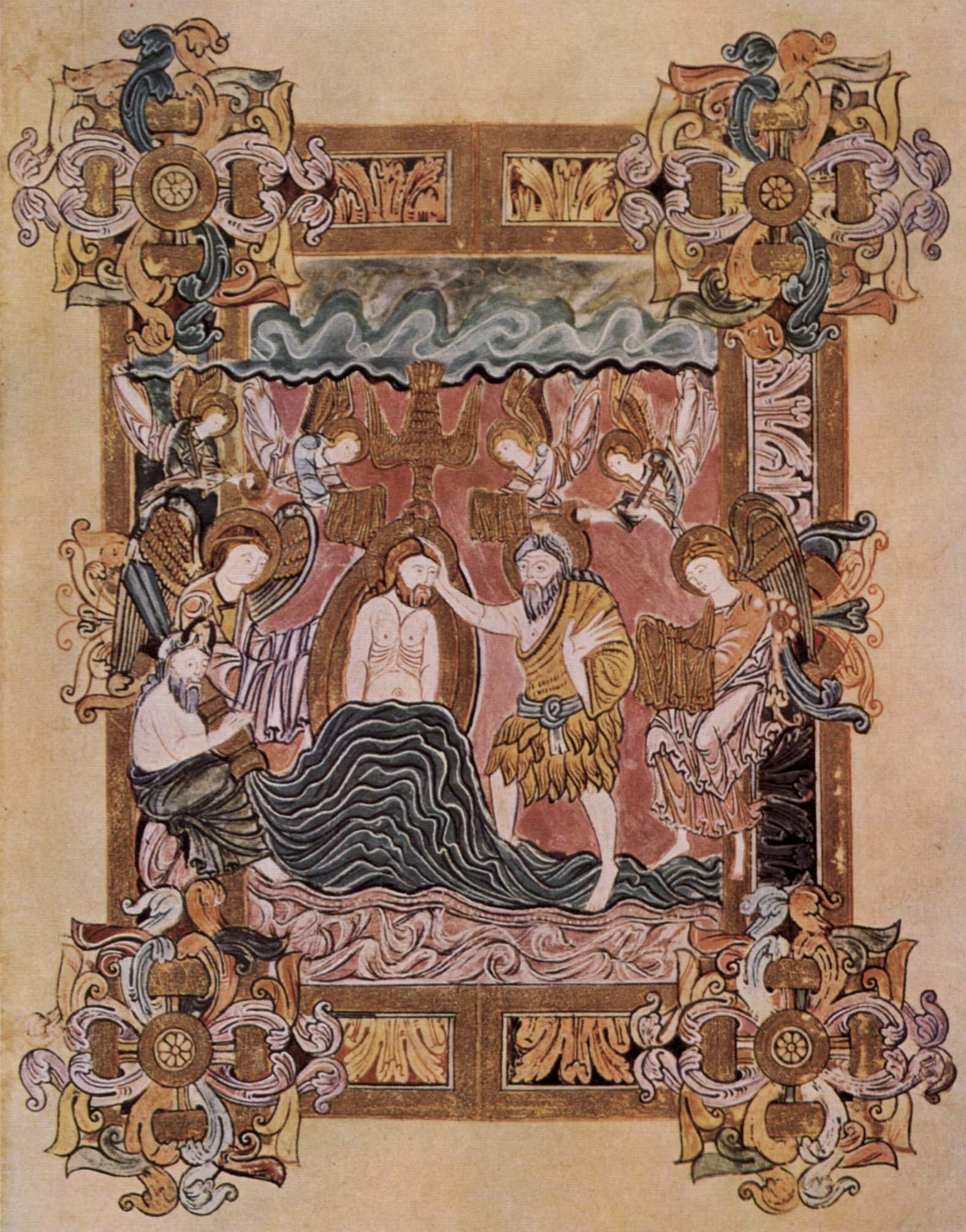
The Baptism of Christ from the Benedictional of Saint Æthelwold, 970s.

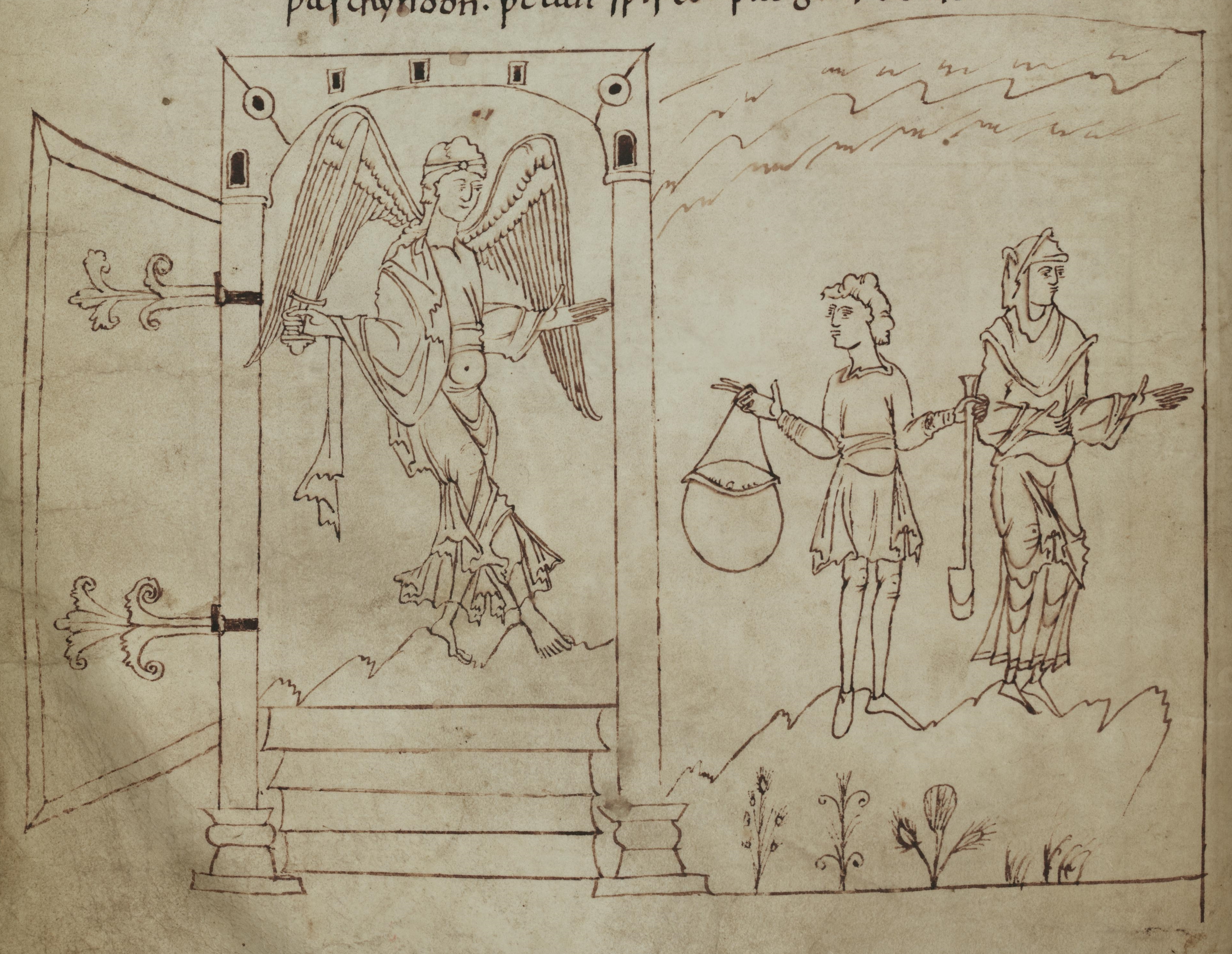
In this illustration from page 46 of the Caedmon manuscript, an angel is shown guarding the gates of paradise, after Adam and Eve have been expelled.

== Metalwork ==
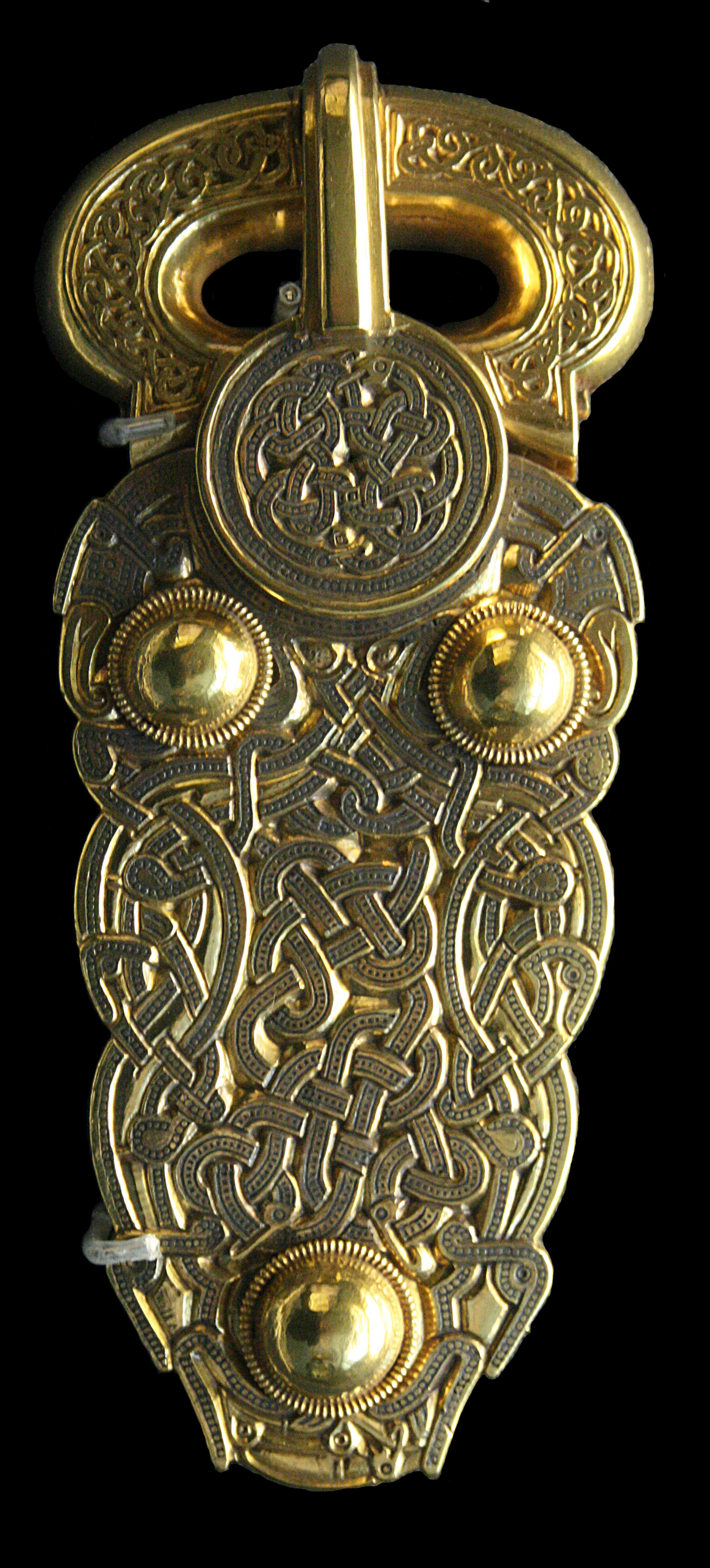
Sutton Hoo, gold and niello belt buckle

Pagan Anglo-Saxon metalwork initially uses the Germanic Animal Style I and II decoration that would be expected from recent immigrants, but gradually develops a distinctive Anglo-Saxon character, as in the Quoit Brooch Style of the 5th century. Anglo-Saxon brooches are the most common survivals of fine metalwork from the earlier period, when they were buried as grave goods. Round disk brooches were preferred for the grandest pieces, over continental styles of fibulae and Romano-British penannular brooches, a consistent Anglo-Saxon taste throughout the period; the Kingston Brooch and Harford Farm Brooch are 7th-century examples. Decoration included cloisonné ("cellwork"), in gold and garnet for high-status pieces.

Despite a considerable number of other finds, the discovery of the ship-burial at Sutton Hoo, probably interred in the 620s, transformed the history of Anglo-Saxon art, showing a level of sophistication and quality that was wholly unexpected at this date. The most famous finds are the helmet and matching suite of purse-lid, belt and other fittings of the king buried there, which made clear the source in Anglo-Saxon art, previously much disputed, of many elements of the style of Insular manuscripts.

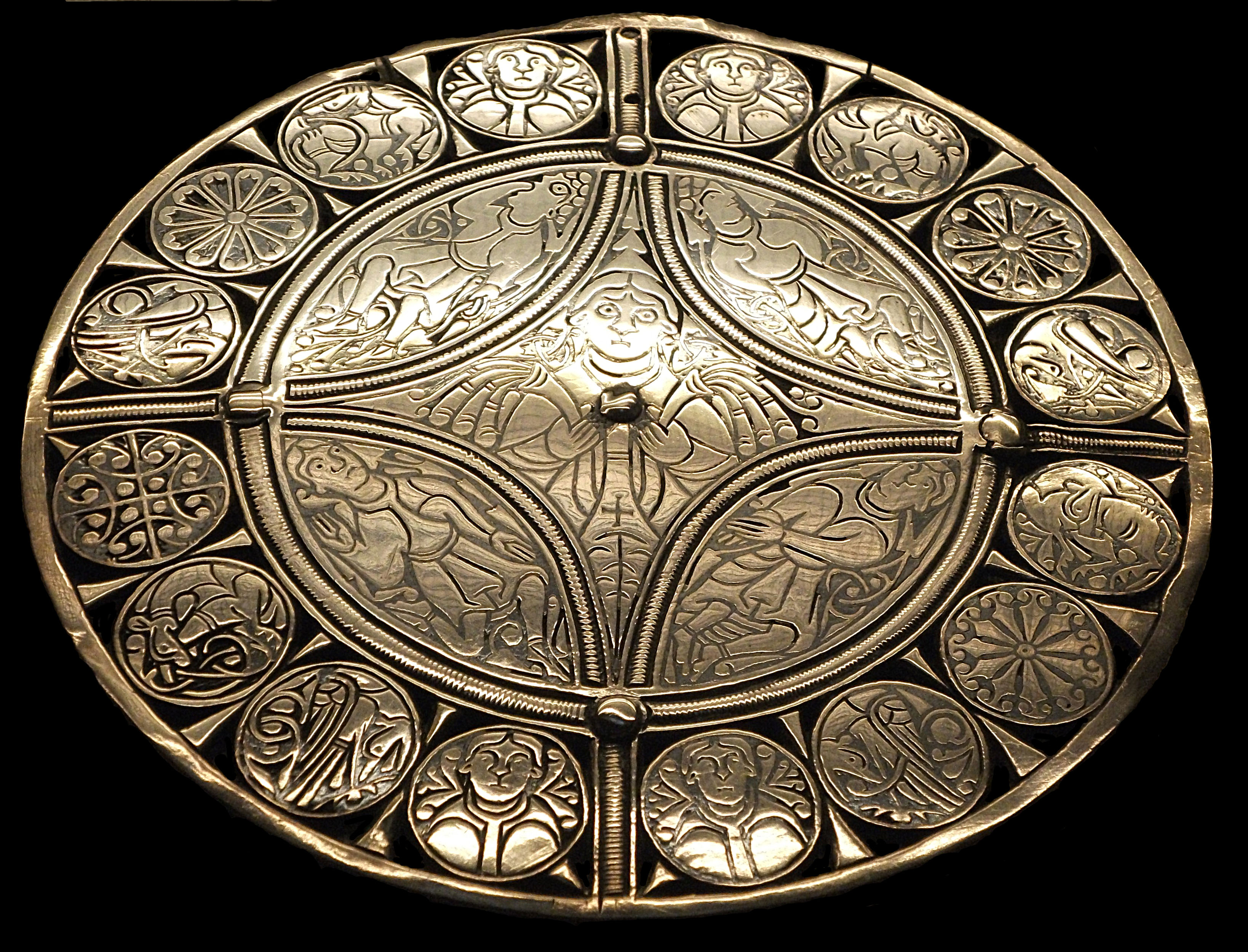
The Fuller Brooch, now in the British Museum

By the 10th century Anglo-Saxon metalwork had a famous reputation as far afield as Italy, where English goldsmiths worked on plate for the altar of St Peter's itself, but hardly any pieces have survived the depredations of the Norman Conquest in 1066, and the English Reformation, and none of the large-scale ones, shrines, doors and statues, that we know existed, and of which a few contemporary continental examples have survived.

The references to specific works by the 11th-century monastic artist Spearhafoc, none of which have identifiably survived, are about works in precious metal, and he is one of a small number of metalwork artists from the period whose name we know and whose work is described in any way. According to several sources, including the Norman chronicler Goscelin, who knew him personally, Spearhafoc "was outstanding in painting, gold-engraving and goldsmithery", the painting very likely mainly in illuminated manuscripts. It was probably his artistic work which brought him into contact with the royal family, and launched his rapid promotion in the church. Even the imprecise details given, mostly by Goscelin, are therefore valuable evidence of what Anglo-Saxon metalwork was like.

Anglo-Saxon skill in gold-engraving, designs and figures engraved on gold objects, is mentioned by many foreign sources, and the few remaining engraved figures closely parallel the far more numerous pen-drawn figures in manuscripts, also an Anglo-Saxon speciality. Wall-paintings, which seem to have sometimes contained gold, were also apparently often made by manuscript illuminators, and Goscelin's description of his talents therefore suggests an artist skilled in all the main Anglo-Saxon media for figurative art – of which being a goldsmith was then regarded as the most prestigious branch. One 11th-century lay goldsmith was even a thegn.

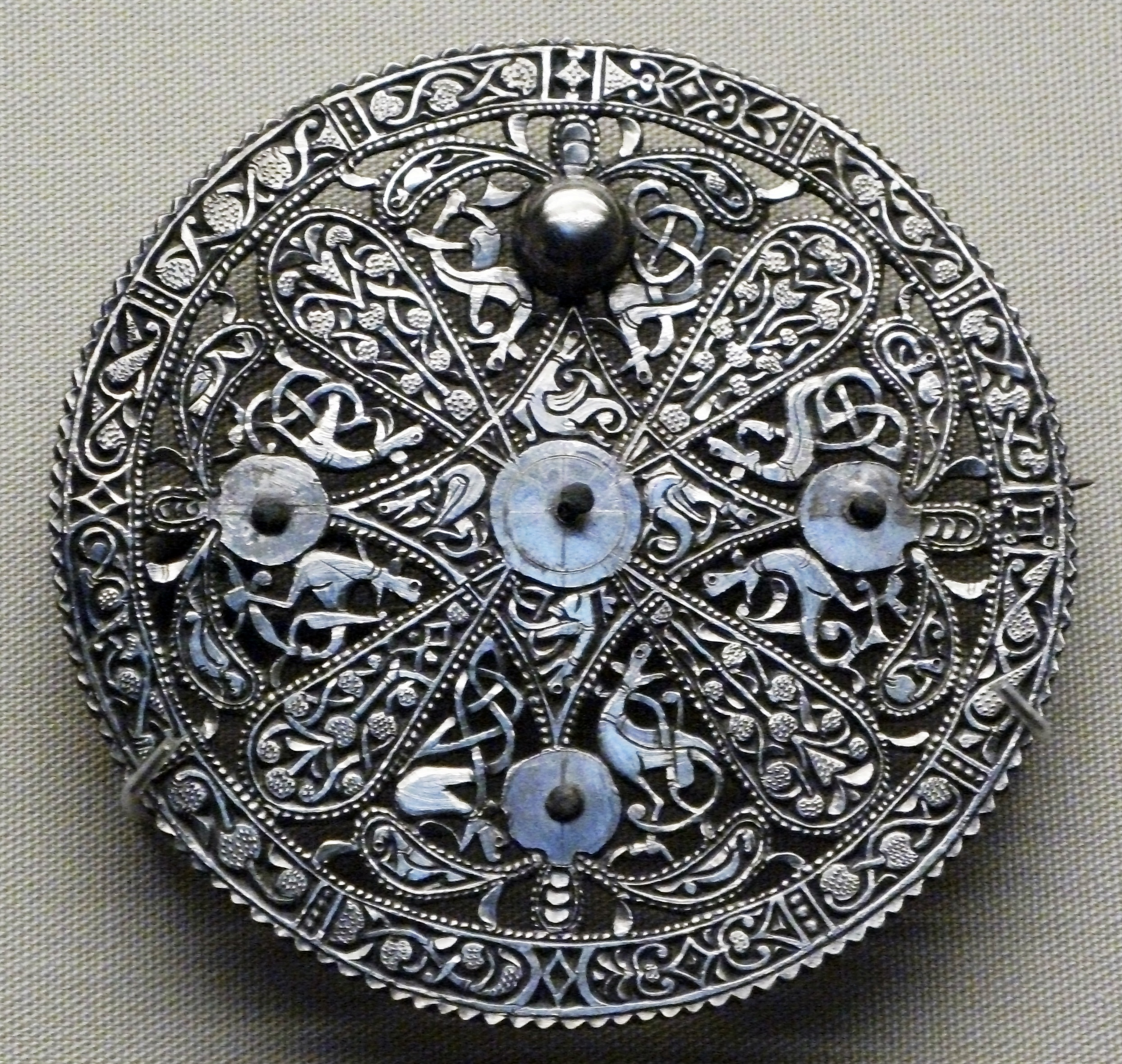
Brooch from the Pentney Hoard, in the Trewhiddle style.

Many monastic artists reached senior positions; Spearhafoc's career in metalwork was paralleled in less sensational fashion by his contemporary Mannig, Abbot of Evesham (Abbot 1044–58, d. 1066), and at the end of the previous century Saint Dunstan had been a very successful Archbishop of Canterbury. Like Spearhafoc, Mannig's biography, with some precise details, is given in the chronicle maintained by his abbey. His work also had a miracle associated with it – the lay goldsmith Godric stabbed his hand with an awl during the work on the large shrine at Evesham, which was miraculously healed overnight. Spearhafoc and Mannig are the "only two goldsmiths of whom we have extended accounts", and the additional information given about Godric, the leader of a team brought in by Mannig for the shrine, is also unique among the surviving evidence. Some twenty years after the miracle, he joined the Abbey of Evesham, presumably in retirement, and his son later became Prior there.

In the final century of the period some large figures in precious metal are recorded; presumably these were made of thin sheets over a wooden core like the Golden Madonna of Essen, the largest example of this type of early medieval figure to survive from anywhere in Europe. These appear to have been life-size, or nearly so, and were mostly crucifixes, sometimes with figures of Mary and John the Evangelist on either side. Patronage by the great figures of the land, and the largest monasteries, became extravagant in this period, and the greatest late Anglo-Saxon churches must have presented a dazzling spectacle, somewhat in the style of Eastern Orthodox churches. Anglo-Saxon taste revelled in expensive materials and the effects of light on precious metals, which were also embroidered into fabrics and used on wall-paintings. Sections of decorated elements from some large looted works such as reliquaries were sawn up by Viking raiders and taken home to their wives to wear as jewellery, and a number of these survive in Scandinavian museums.

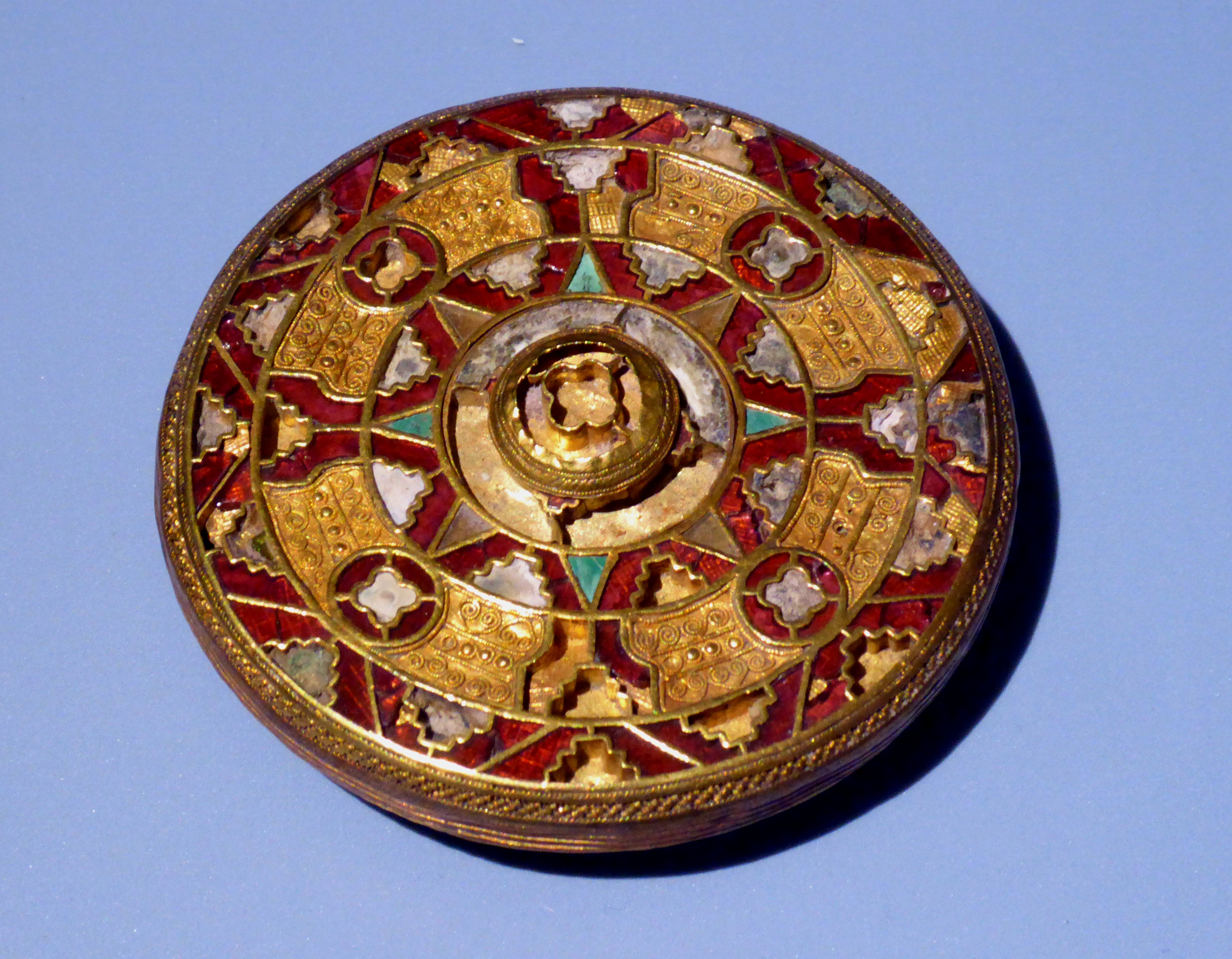
Disc brooch from Monkton, on display at the Ashmolean Museum

=== Discoveries ===
While larger works are all lost, several small objects and fragments have survived, nearly all having been buried; in recent decades professional archaeology as well as metal-detecting and deep ploughing have greatly increased the number of objects known. Among the few unburied exceptions are the secular Fuller Brooch, and two works made in Anglo-Saxon style carried to Austria by the Anglo-Saxon mission, the Tassilo Chalice (late 8th century) and the Rupertus Cross. Especially in the 9th century, Anglo-Saxon styles, sometimes derived from manuscripts rather than metal examples, are found in a great number of smaller pieces of jewellery and other small fittings from across northern Europe.

From England itself, the Alfred Jewel, with an enamel face, is the best known of a group of finely worked liturgical jewels, and there are a number of high quality disk brooches. The most ornate of earlier ones are colourful and complicated with inlays and filigrees, but the 9th century Pentney Hoard, discovered in 1978, contained six splendid brooches in flat silver openwork in the "Trewhiddle style". In these small but fully formed animals, of no recognisable species, contort themselves in foliage and tendrils that interlace, but without the emphatic geometry of the earlier "ribbon" style. Ædwen's brooch, an 11th-century Anglo-Scandinavian silver disk brooch, shows influence from Viking art, and a fall-off from the highest earlier standards of workmanship.

In 2009 the Staffordshire hoard, a major hoard of over 1,500 fragments of 7th and ?8th century metalwork pieces, mostly gold and military in nature, many with gold and garnet cloisonné inlays of high quality, was found by a metal-detectorist in Staffordshire, then in Mercia. Jewellery is far more often found from burials of the early pagan period, as Christianity discouraged grave-goods, even the personal possessions of the deceased. Early Anglo-Saxon jewellery includes various types of fibulae that are close to their Continental Germanic equivalents, but until Sutton Hoo rarely of outstanding quality, which is why that find transformed thinking about early Anglo-Saxon art. Objects from the Royal Anglo-Saxon tomb in Prittlewell in Essex, dating from the late 6th century and discovered in 2003, were put on display in Southend Central Museum in 2019.

The earliest Anglo-Saxon coin type, the silver sceat, forced craftsmen, no doubt asked to copy Roman and contemporary continental styles, to work outside their traditional forms and conventions in respect of the heads on the obverse, with results that are varied and often compelling. Later silver pennies, with largely linear relief heads of kings in profile on the obverse, are more uniform, as representatives of what was a stable and respected currency by contemporary European standards. A number of complete seax knives have survived with inscriptions and some decoration, and sword fittings and other military pieces are an important form of jewellery. A treatise on social status needed to say that mere ownership of a gilded sword did not make a man a ceorle, the lowest rank of free men.

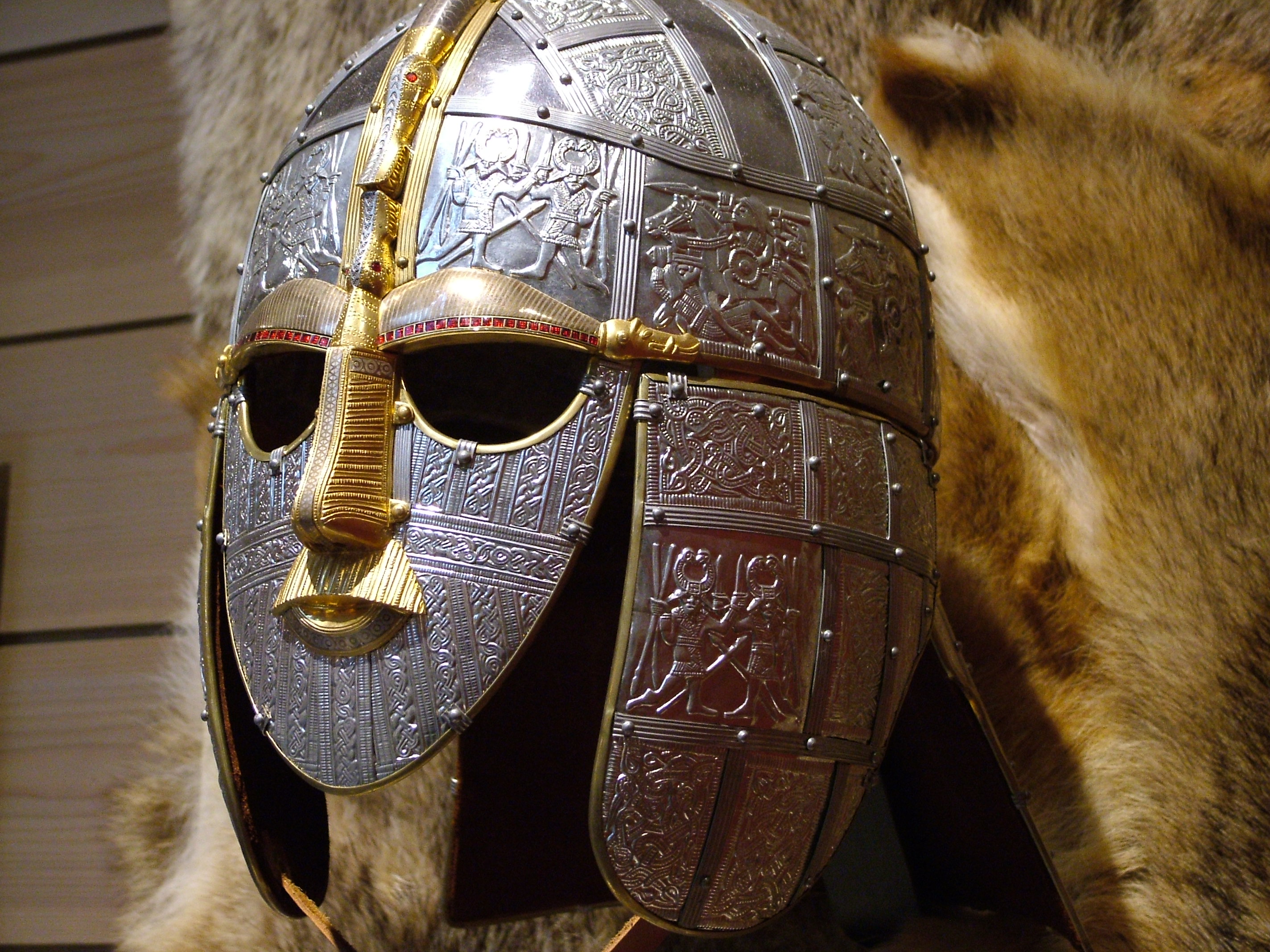
Replica helmet from Sutton Hoo in Suffolk

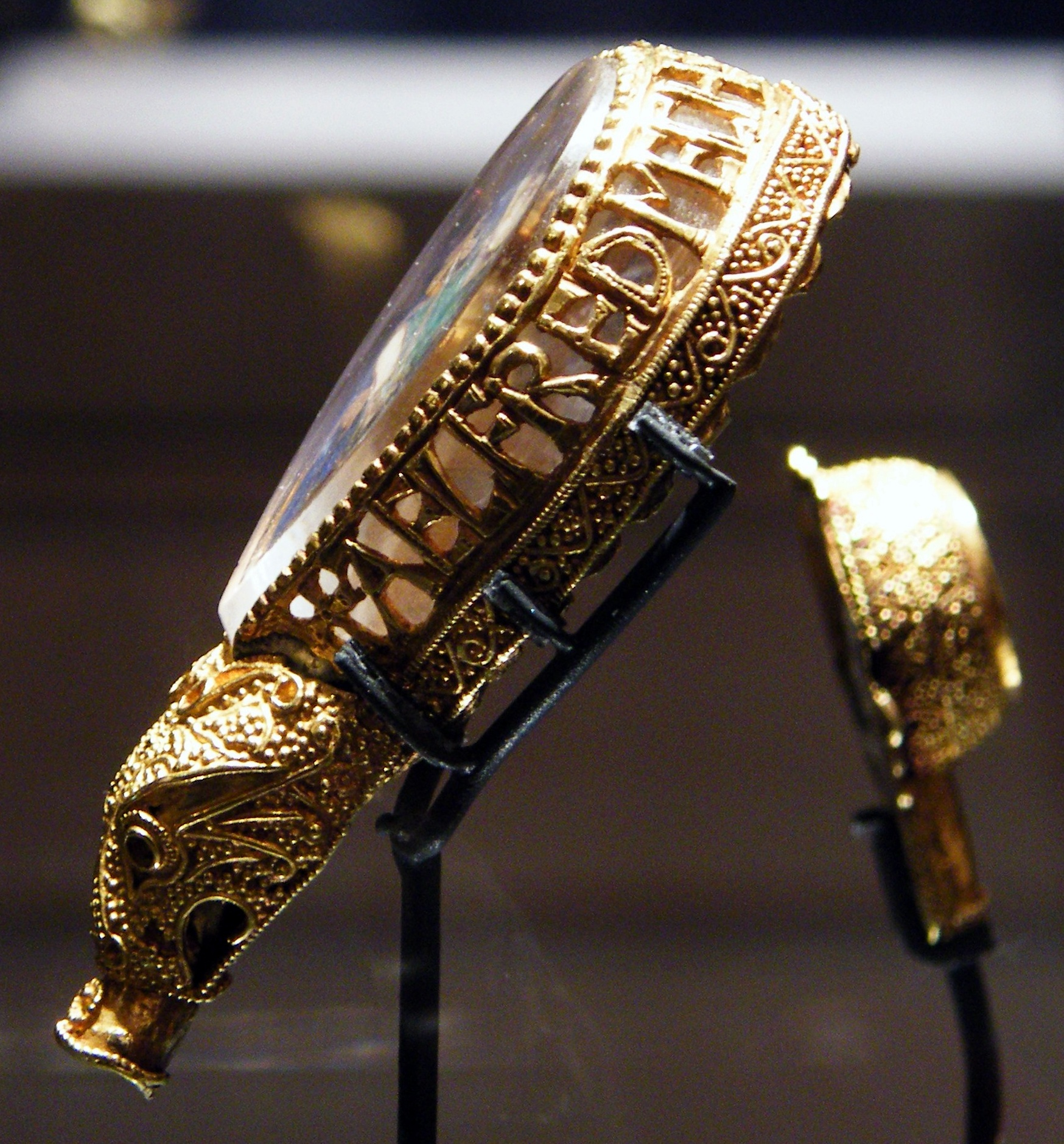
The Alfred Jewel, probably (with a shaft affixed in its socket) a pointer for reading. The name AELFRED can be seen.

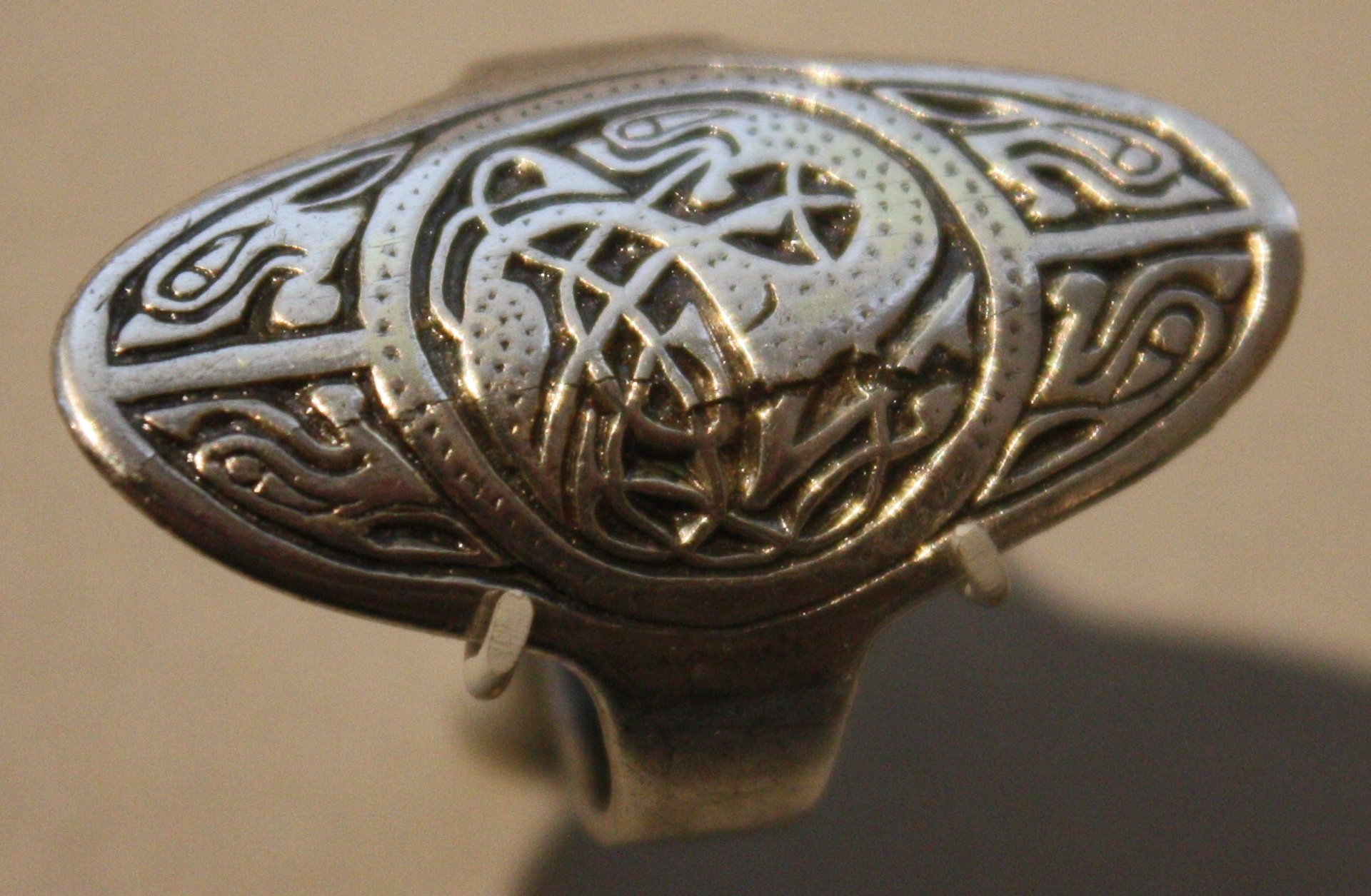
Ring, 775-850, in Trewhiddle style

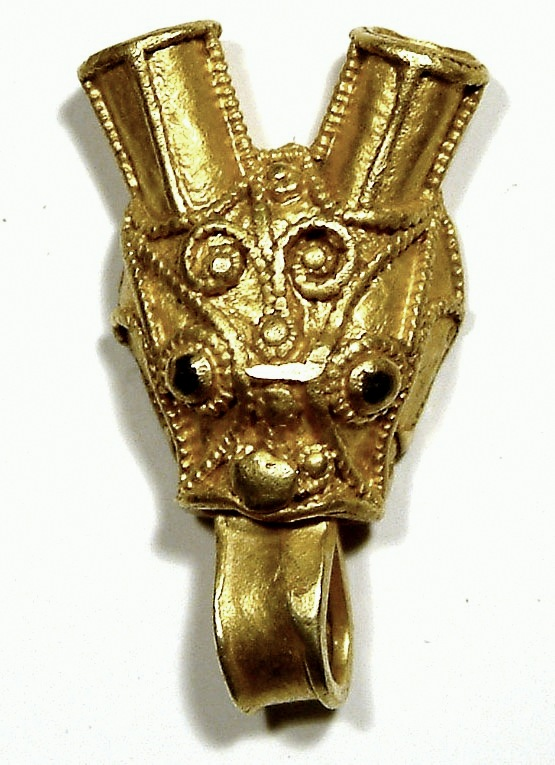
The Sutton-on-the-Forest Mount from North Yorkshire. An unusual strap mount in the form of an animal head

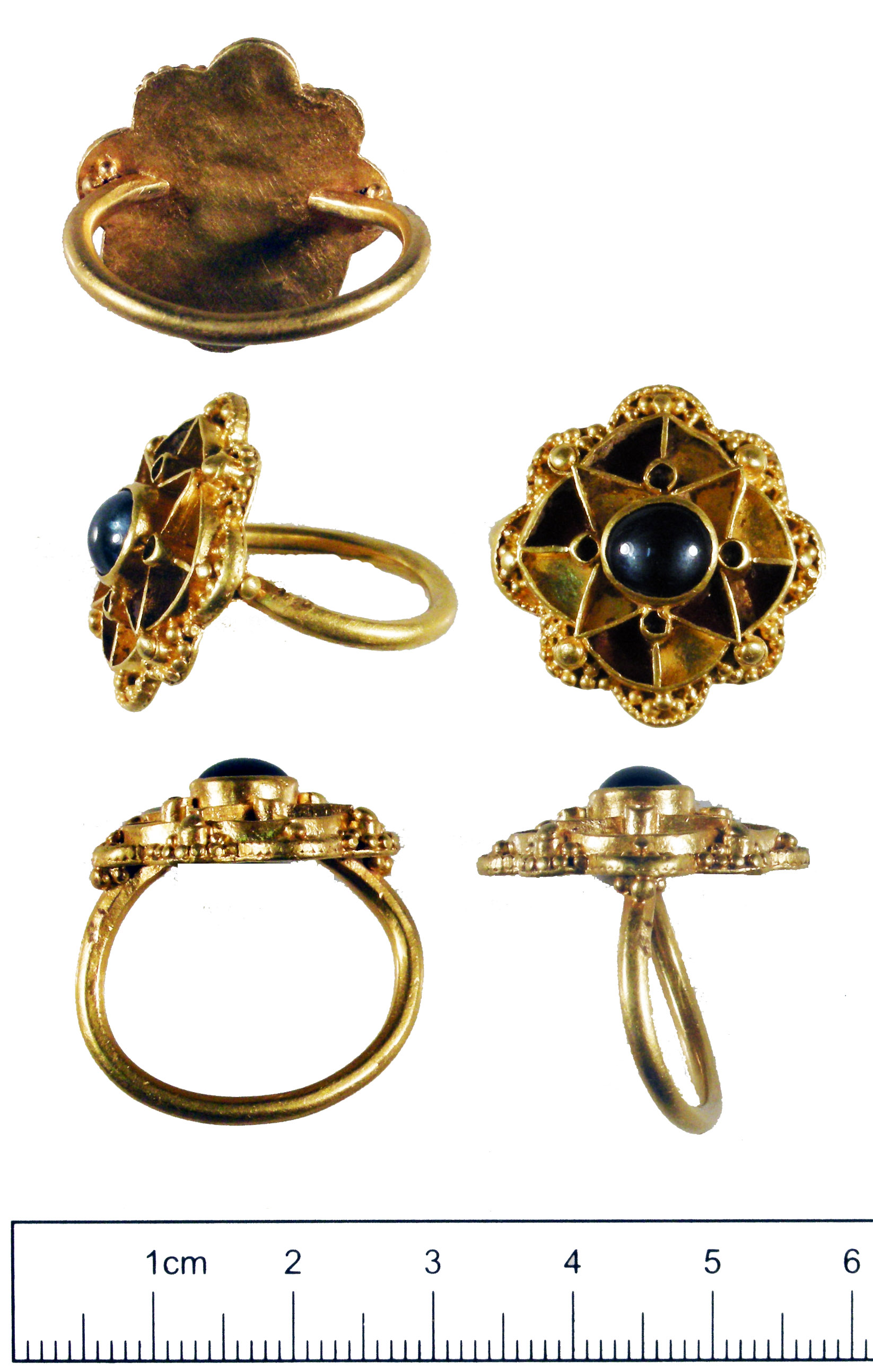
The Escrick ring of gold with a sapphire and glass inset

== Monumental sculpture and wall painting ==
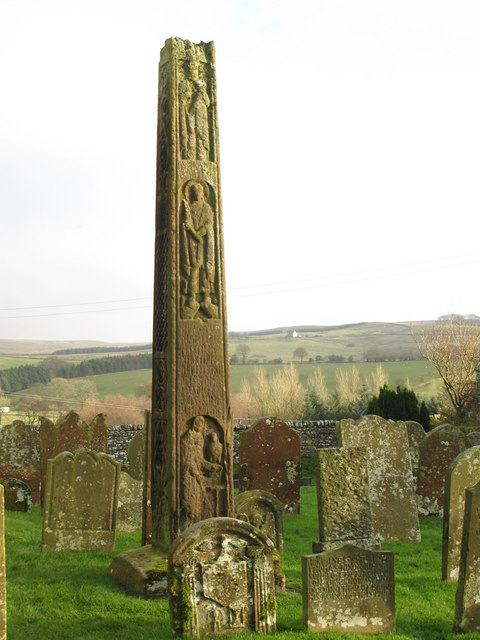
The Bewcastle Cross (alternative view) in Cumbria

Apart from Anglo-Saxon architecture, which survives entirely in churches, with only a handful of largely unaltered examples, monumental stone sculpture survives in large stone crosses, an equivalent to the high crosses of the Celtic areas of Britain. Most sculpture was probably once painted, clarifying the designs, which are mostly in relatively low relief and not finished with great precision, and now almost all badly worn and weathered. Dating is usually difficult.

Sculpture in wood was very likely more common, but almost the only significant large survival is St Cuthbert's coffin in Durham Cathedral, probably made in 698, with numerous linear images carved or incised in a technique that is a sort of large-scale engraving. The material of the earliest recorded crosses is unknown, but may well have been wood. From various references (to its destruction by Christians) there would seem to have been a tradition of Anglo-Saxon pagan monumental sculpture, probably in wood, of which no examples remain (as opposed to later Anglo-Scandinavian pagan imagery), and with which the crosses initially competed.

The Anglo-Saxon crosses have survived less well than those in Ireland, being more subject to iconoclasm after the English Reformation. Some featured large figurative sculpture of considerable quality, as on the Ruthwell Cross and Bewcastle Cross (both probably around 800). Vine-scroll decoration and interlace are seen in alternating panels on the early Northumbrian Ruthwell, Bewcastle and Easby Crosses, though the vine-scroll is already more prominent, and has faces to itself. Later Southumbrian crosses often only use vine-scrolls. There may be inscriptions, in the runic or Roman scripts, and Latin or Old English, most famously at Ruthwell, where some of the poem the Dream of the Rood is inscribed together with Latin texts; more often donors are commemorated. It has also been suggested that as well as paint, they may have been embellished with metalwork and gems.

Typically, Anglo-Saxon crosses are tall and slender compared to Irish examples, many with a nearly square section, and more space given to ornament than figures. However, there are exceptions, like the massive Sandbach Crosses from Mercia, with oblong sections mostly covered by figures on the wider faces, like some Irish crosses. The Gosforth Cross, of 930–950, is a rare example to survive complete; most survivals are only a section of the shaft, and iconoclasts were more concerned to destroy imagery than ornament. Many crosses must have just fallen over after some centuries; headpieces are the least common survivals, and the Easby Cross was repaired with lead in a way described in early documents. Like many monuments from the area of the Danelaw, the Gosforth Cross combines Christian images with those from pagan mythology; apart from a Crucifixion scene, and perhaps scenes of the Last Judgement, all the other images appear to belong to the Norse myth of Ragnarök, the destruction of the gods, a theme detected in other Christian monuments in Britain and Scandinavia, and which could be turned to Christian advantage.

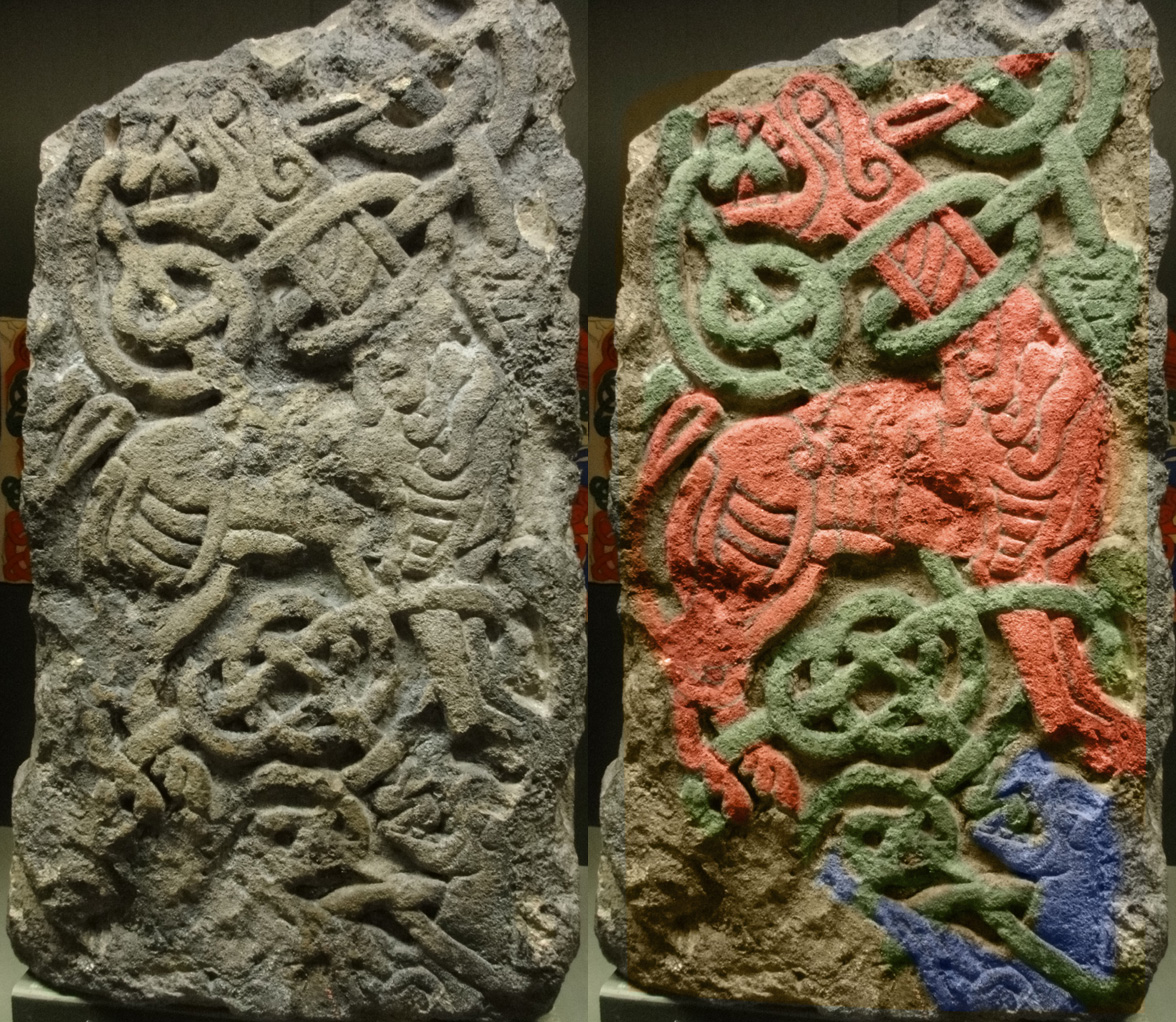
Fragment of cross shaft from St Oswald's Priory, Gloucester; at right with added, but perhaps not inauthentic, colour.

Anglo-Scandinavians took up Anglo-Saxon sculptural forms with great enthusiasm, and in Yorkshire alone there are fragments from more than 500 monumental sculptures of the 10th and 11th centuries. However quantity was not matched by quality, and even the products of the main city, York, are described by David M. Wilson as "generally miserable and slipshod". In the early stages the successive styles of Norse art appear in England, but gradually as political and cultural ties weakened the Anglo-Scandinavians fail to keep up with trends in the homeland. So elements of the Borre style are seen, for example in the "ring-chain" interlace on the Gosforth Cross, and then the complex animals of the Jelling style are mostly rather incompetently depicted in England, but traces of the next Mammen style are hard to detect; they are much clearer on the Isle of Man. They are "perhaps, dimly" evident in the cross shaft from St Oswald's Priory, Gloucester (illustrated above right). In general the traces of these styles in other media are even fainter.

A uniquely Anglo-Scandinavian form is the hogback, low grave-marker shaped like a long house with a pitched roof, and sometimes muzzled bears clutching on to each end. Ornament is sometimes a crude pattern of scoring, or scale-like elements presumably representing roofing shingles, but may include interlace and images.

Many fragments, parts of friezes and panels with figure and ornamental carving, have been recovered by archaeology, usually after being reused in rebuilt churches. The largest group of Anglo-Saxon sculpture is from a former abbey at Breedon-on-the-Hill in Mercia, with a number of elements of different dates, including lively narrow decorative strip friezes, many including human figures, and panels with saints and the Virgin. The most intriguing fragments are firstly a group, now at Canterbury Cathedral, from St Mary's Church, Reculver, in Kent, from a large composition with many figure scenes and groups on a curved surface, evidently of high quality, though uncertain date (perhaps early 10th century). A Sacrifice of Isaac and an Ascension can be identified, and parts of standing groups of saints, prophets or apostles.

Standing equally apart from other survivals is a late slab from the Old Minster, Winchester which appears to show a section of a large frieze with the story from Germanic mythology of Sigmund, which it has been suggested may have been as long as eighty feet wide, and over four feet high. There are literary references to secular narrative tapestries, a tradition of which the Bayeux Tapestry is the only survival, and this may have been a stone equivalent, celebrating Sigmund, who was believed to be an ancestor of the intermarried royal houses of both England and Denmark, many of whom were buried in what was then the largest church in England.

It is also clear from literary sources that wall paintings were not uncommon, although not a prestigious form, and fragments of painted plaster have been found, as well as a painted face on a reused stone at Winchester, dating to before 903, and so an important early example of the Winchester figure style. A metaphor in a letter of Alcuin speaks of "stars, like the painted ceiling of a great man's house". However, no paintings that are at all complete have survived on either wall or panel.

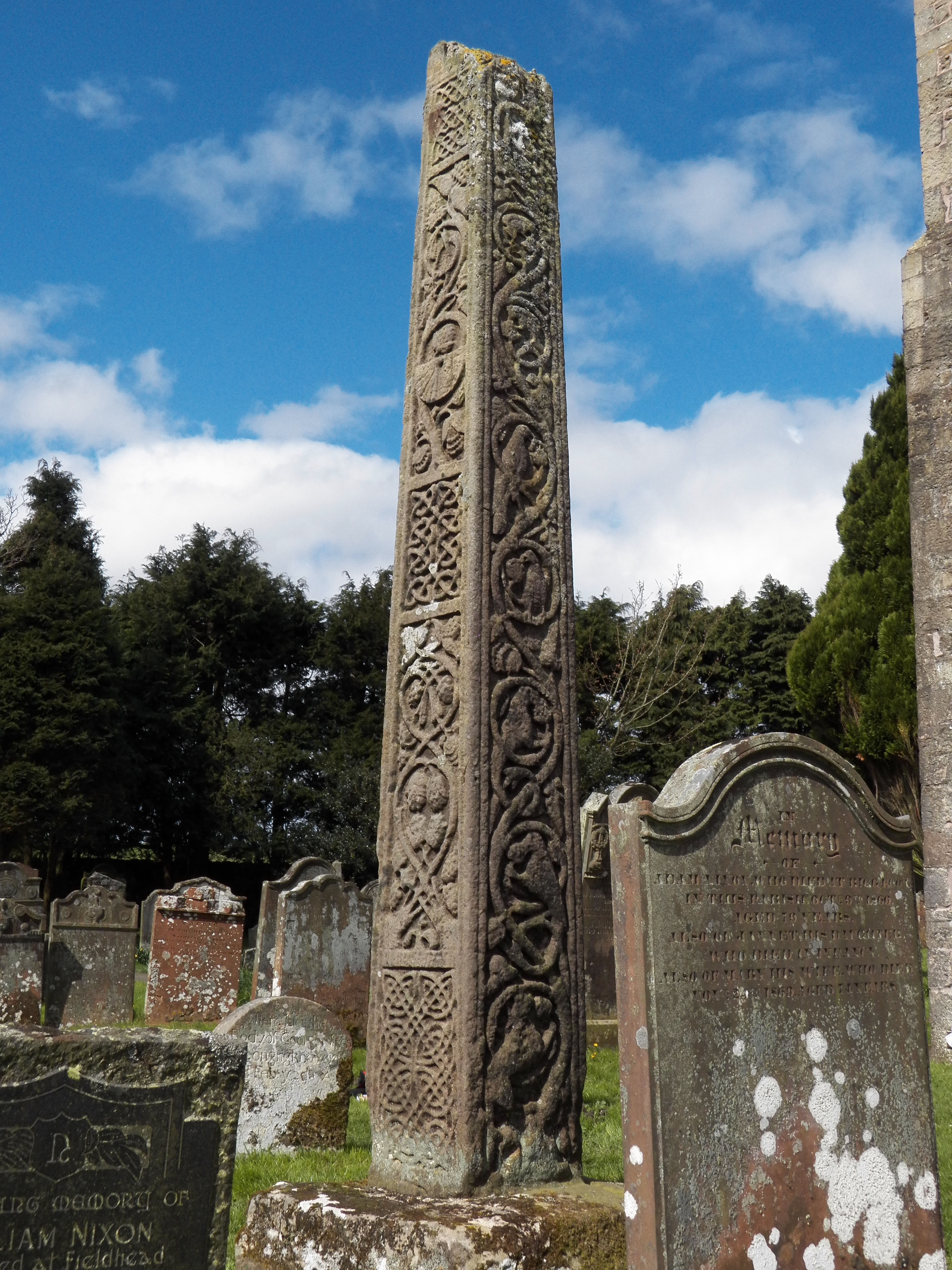
Bewcastle Cross – south and east faces

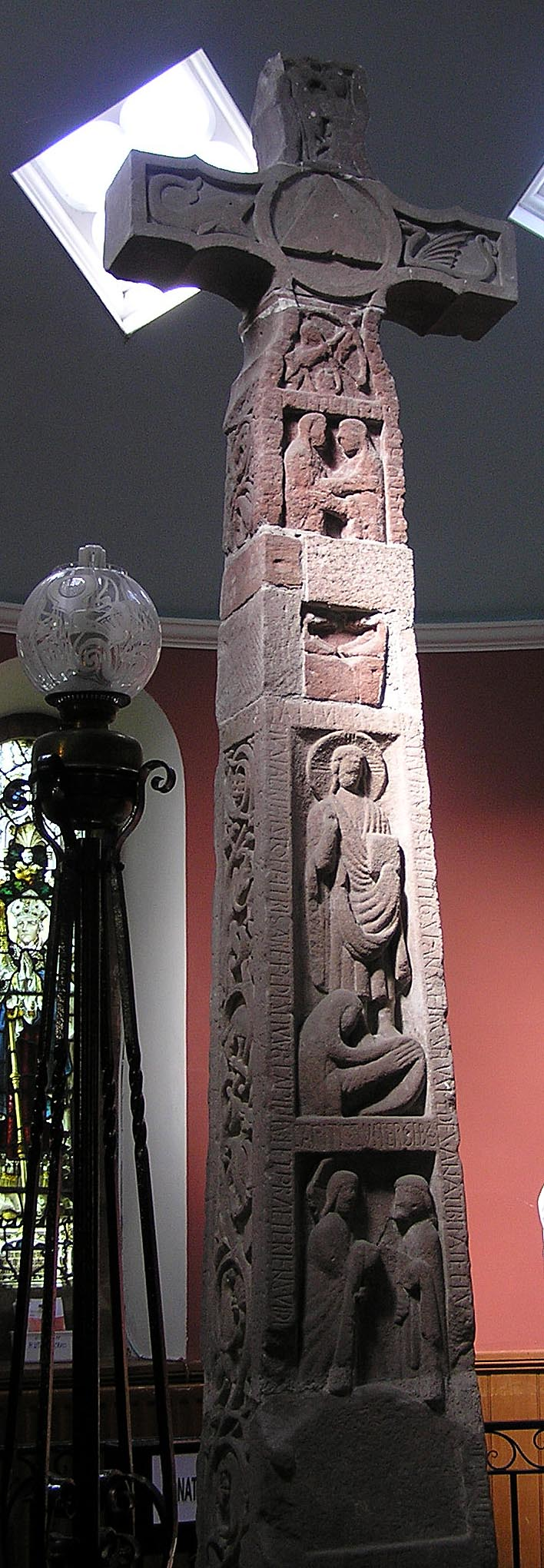
The Ruthwell Cross, Dumfries and Galloway, Scotland

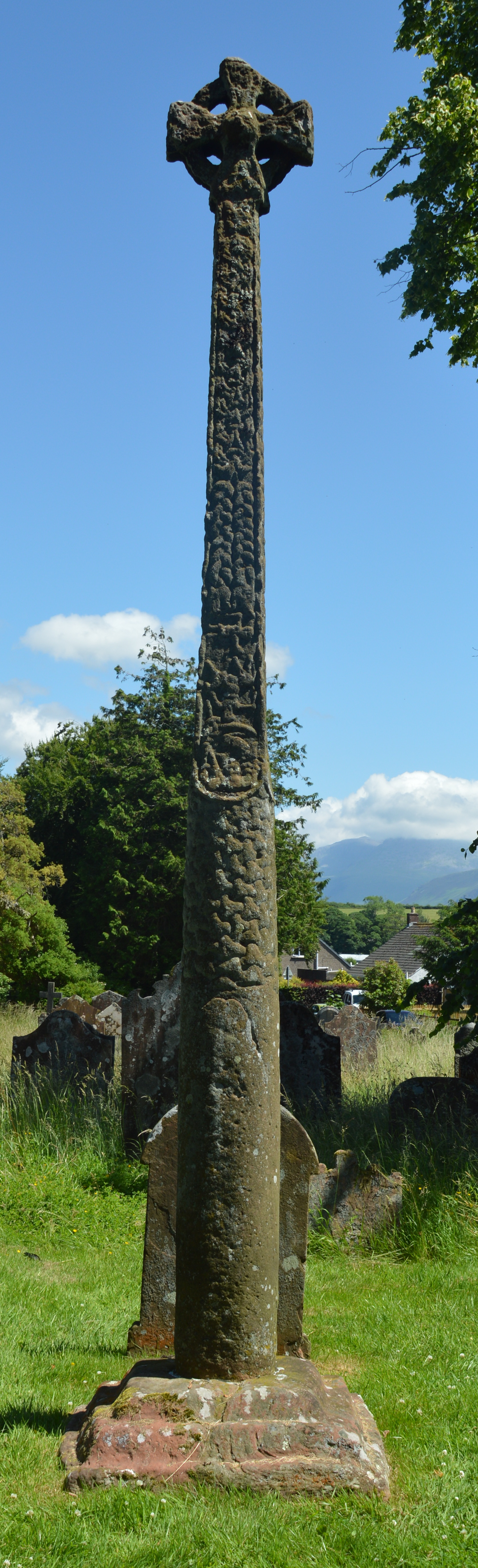
The Gosforth Cross, Cumbria

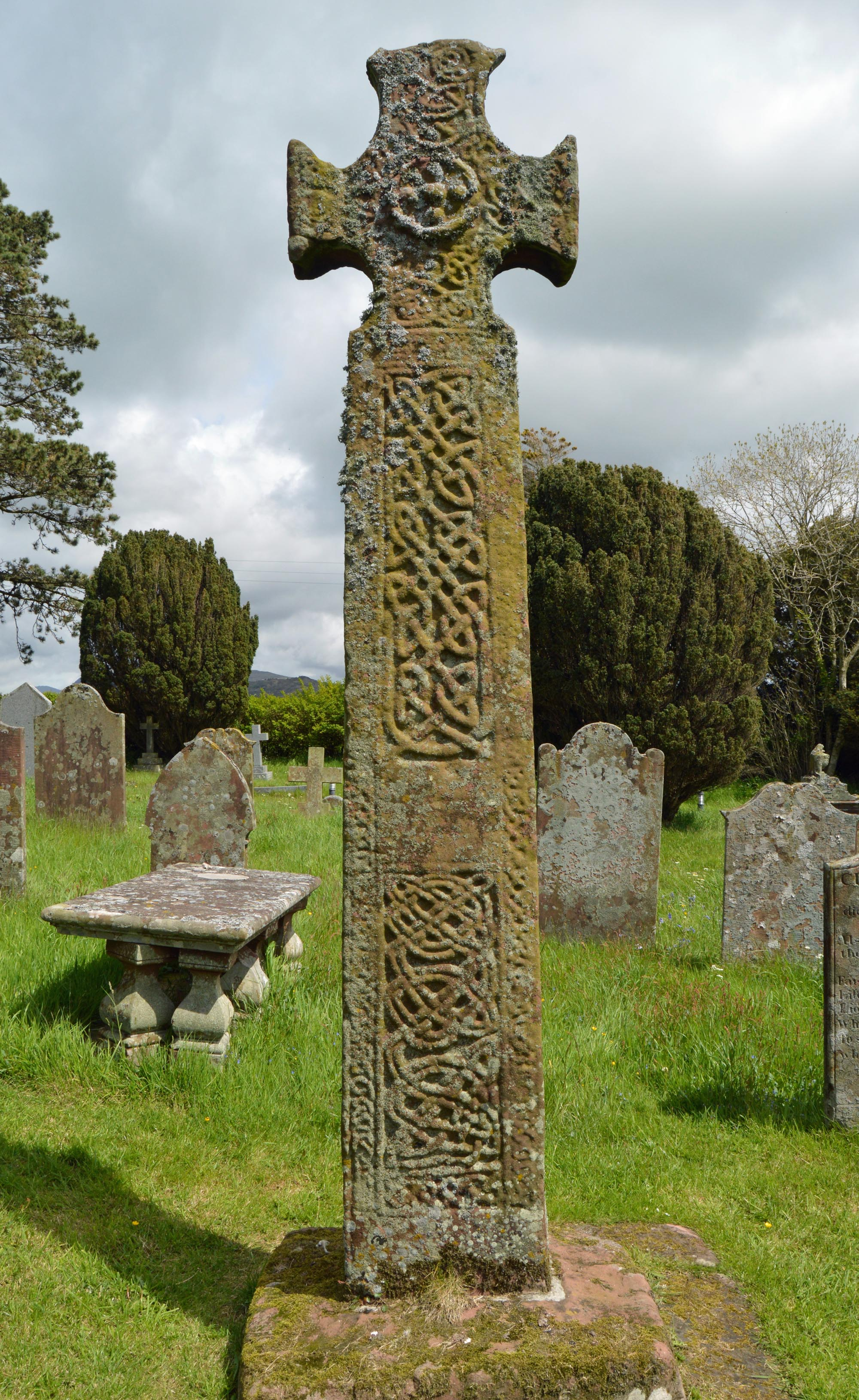
Irton Cross, Cumbria

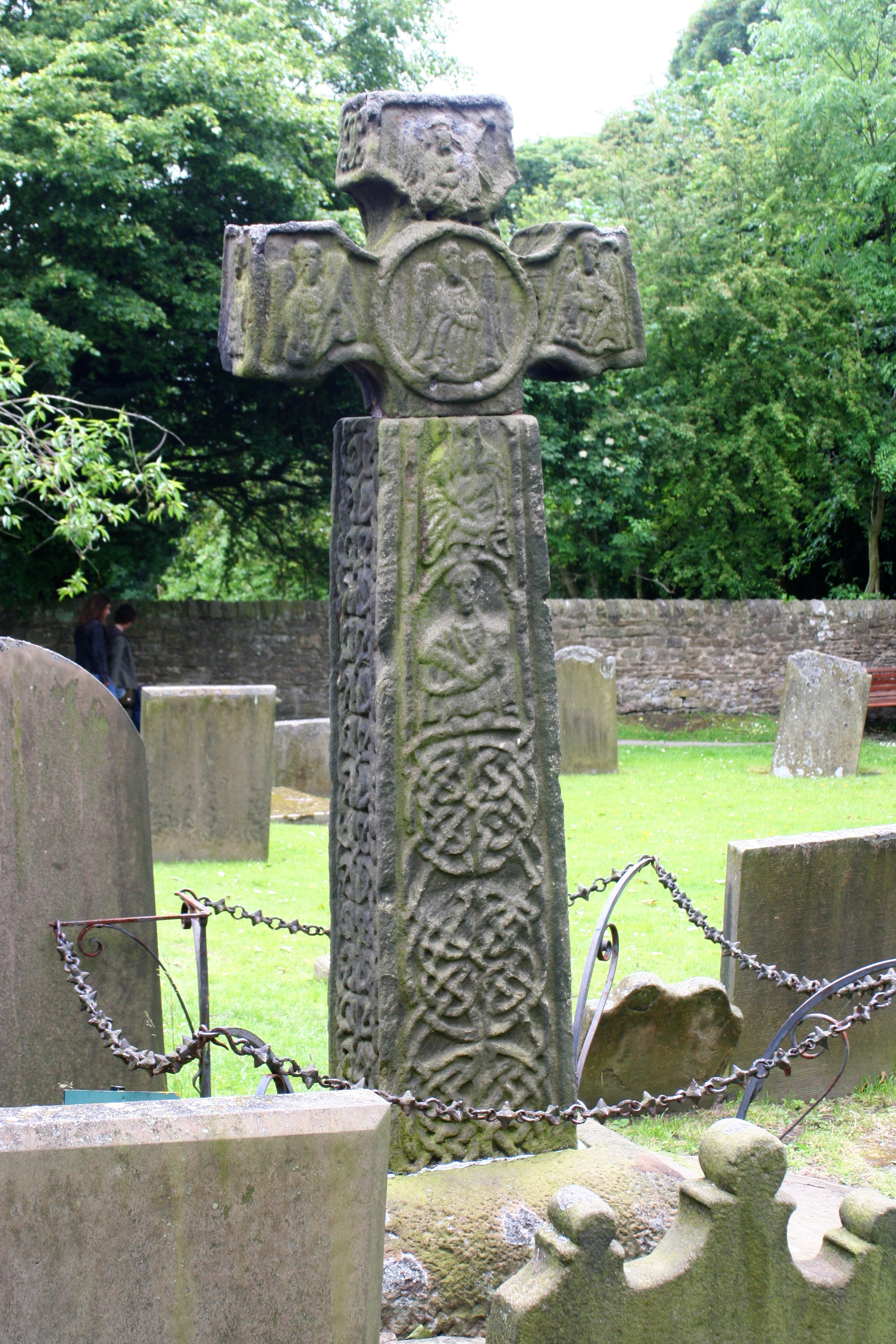
8th-century cross at Eyam in Derbyshire (section missing) with interlace; see here for face with vine-scrolls

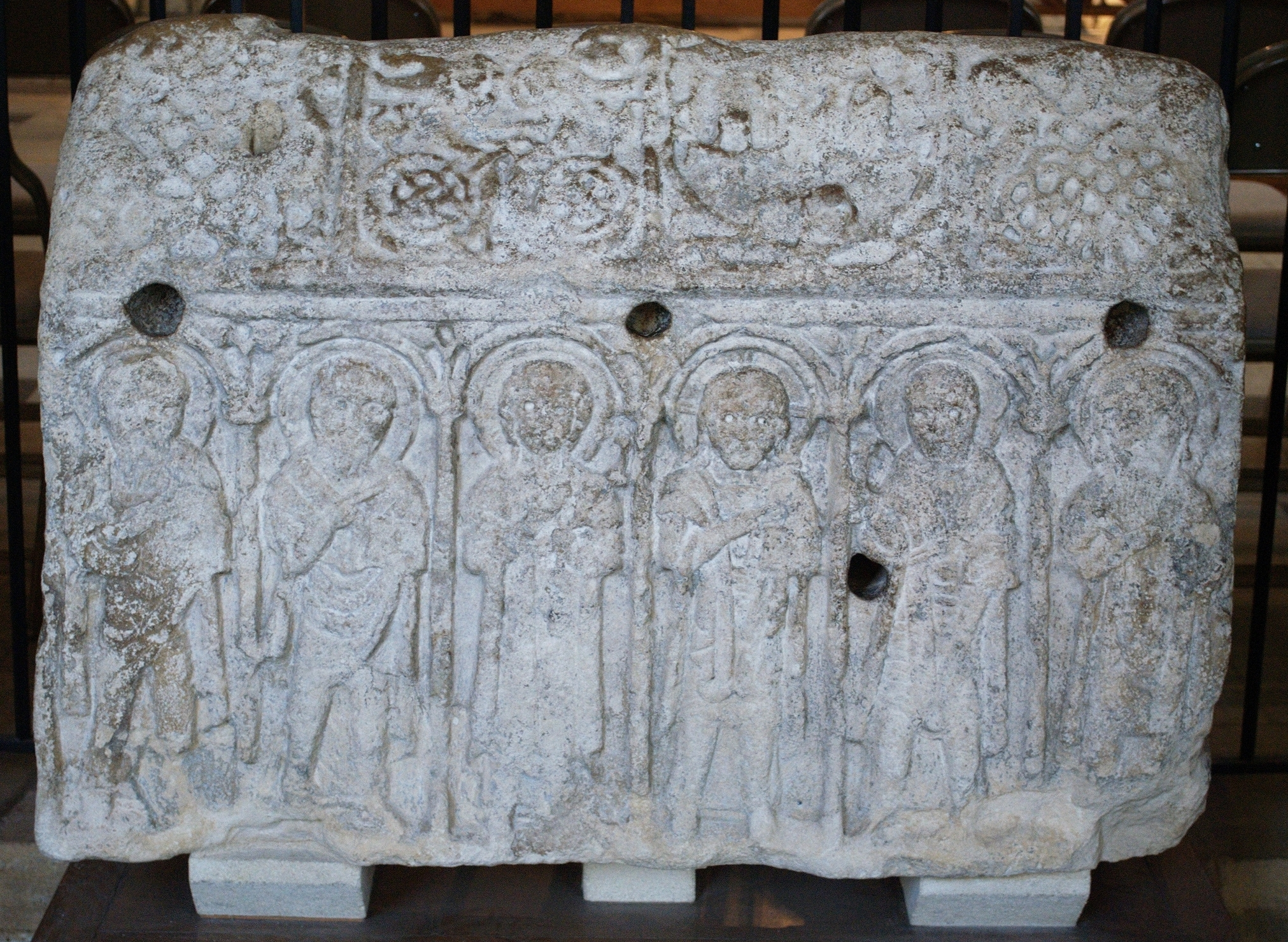
The Hedda Stone in Peterborough Cathedral, a rare example of 8th-century Anglo-Saxon stone carving not from a cross.

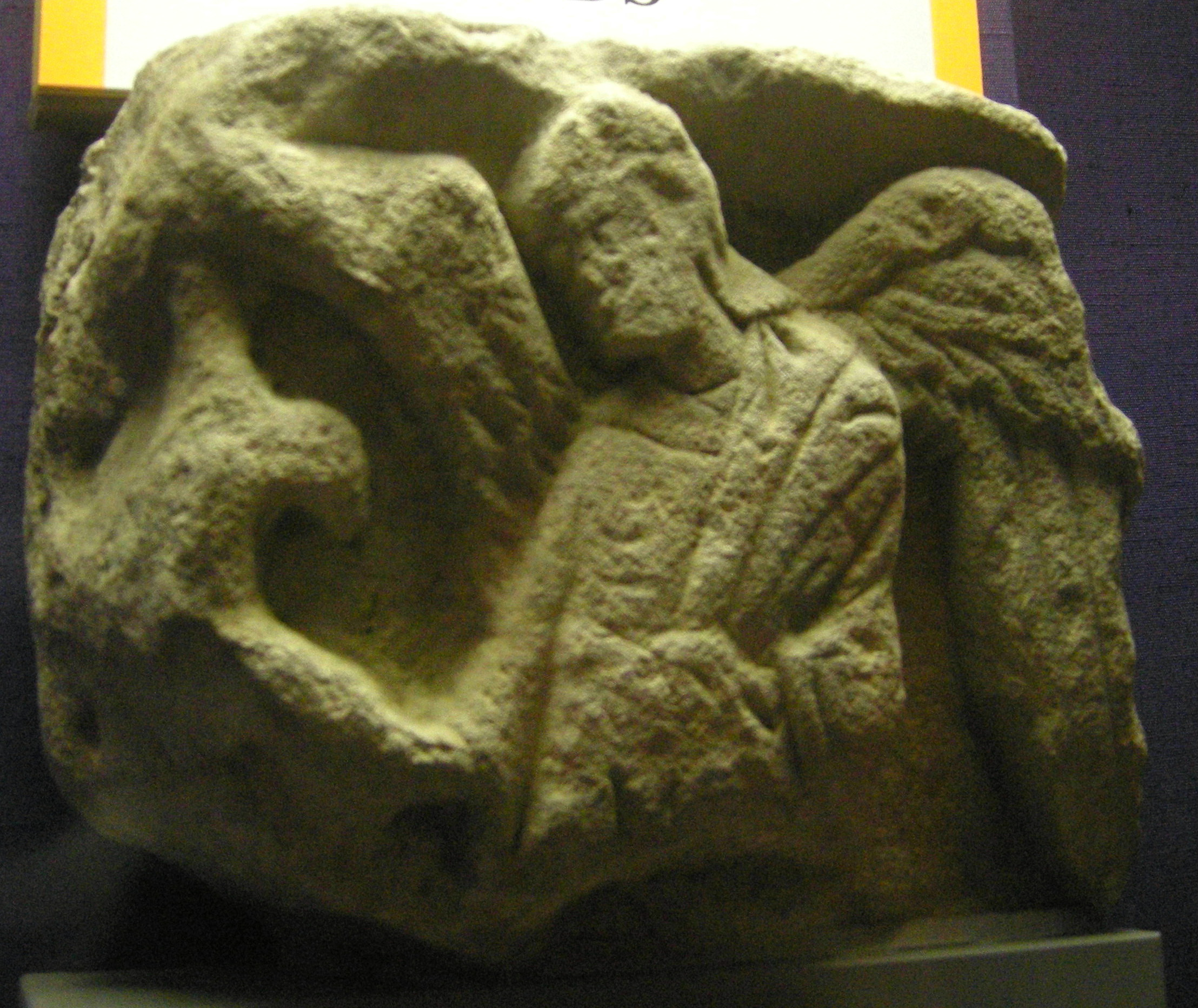
Worn relief of an angel from St Mary's Church, Reculver in Kent

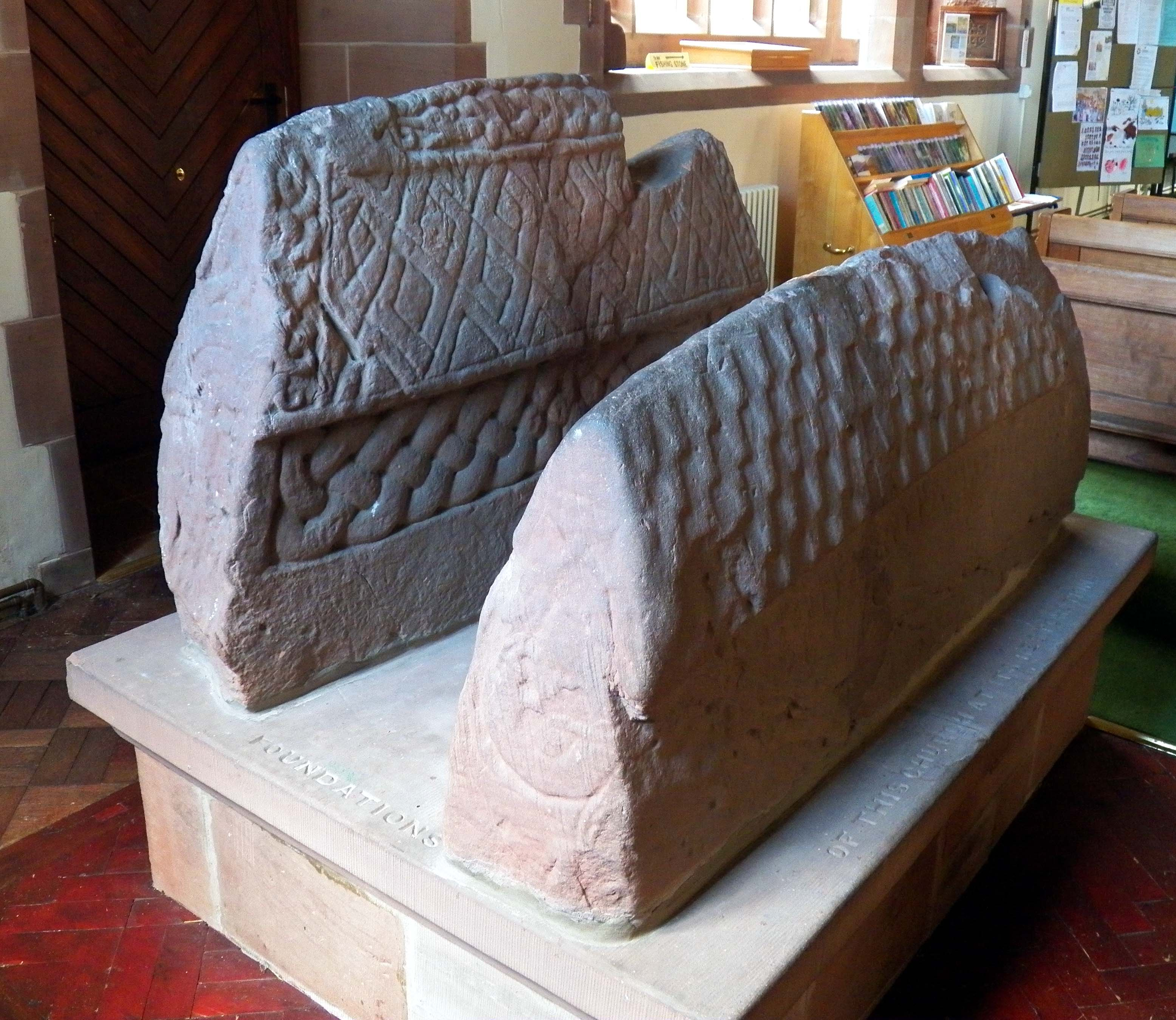
Hogback tombs at Gosforth, Cumbria

== Ivory carving ==
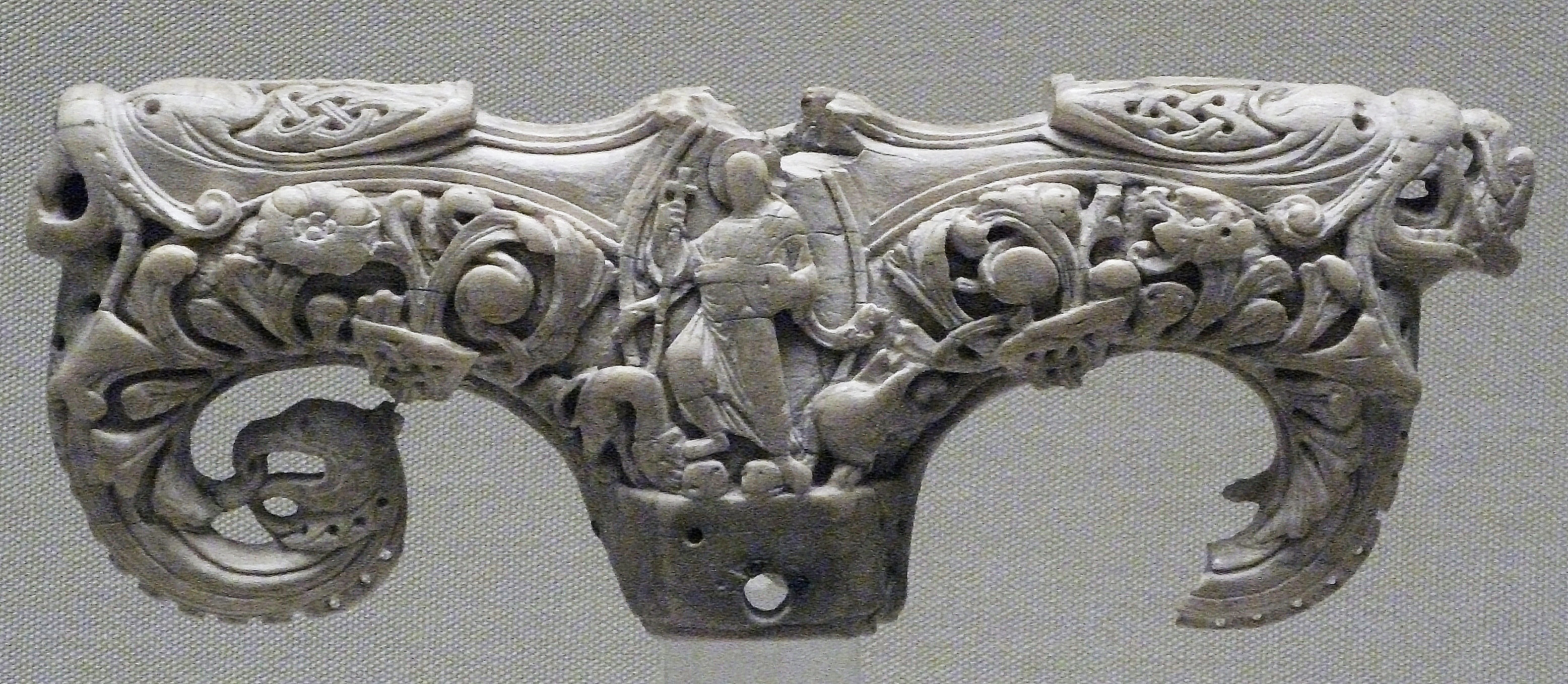
Head of a tau cross, with Christ Treading on the Beasts, an especially popular subject in England

As in the rest of the Christian world, while monumental sculpture was slowly re-emerging from its virtual absence in the Early Christian period, small-scale sculpture in metalwork, ivory carving and also bone carving was more important than in later periods, and by no means a "minor art". Most Anglo-Saxon ivory was from marine animals, especially the walrus, imported from further north. The extraordinary early Franks Casket is carved from whale bone, which a riddle on it alludes to. It contains a unique mixture of pagan, historical and Christian scenes, evidently attempting to cover a general history of the world, and inscriptions in runes in both Latin and Old English.

Few Anglo-Saxon panels from book-covers have survived compared to those from Carolingian and Ottonian art but a number of figures of very high quality in high relief or fully in the round. In the last phase of Anglo-Saxon art two styles are apparent: one a heavier and formal one drawing from Carolingian and Ottonian sources, and the other the Winchester style, drawing from the Utrecht Psalter and an alternative Carolingian tradition. A very late boxwood casket, now in Cleveland, Ohio, is carved all over with scenes from the Life of Christ in a provincial but accomplished version of the Winchester style, possibly originating in the West Midlands, and is a unique survival of late Anglo-Saxon fine wood carving.

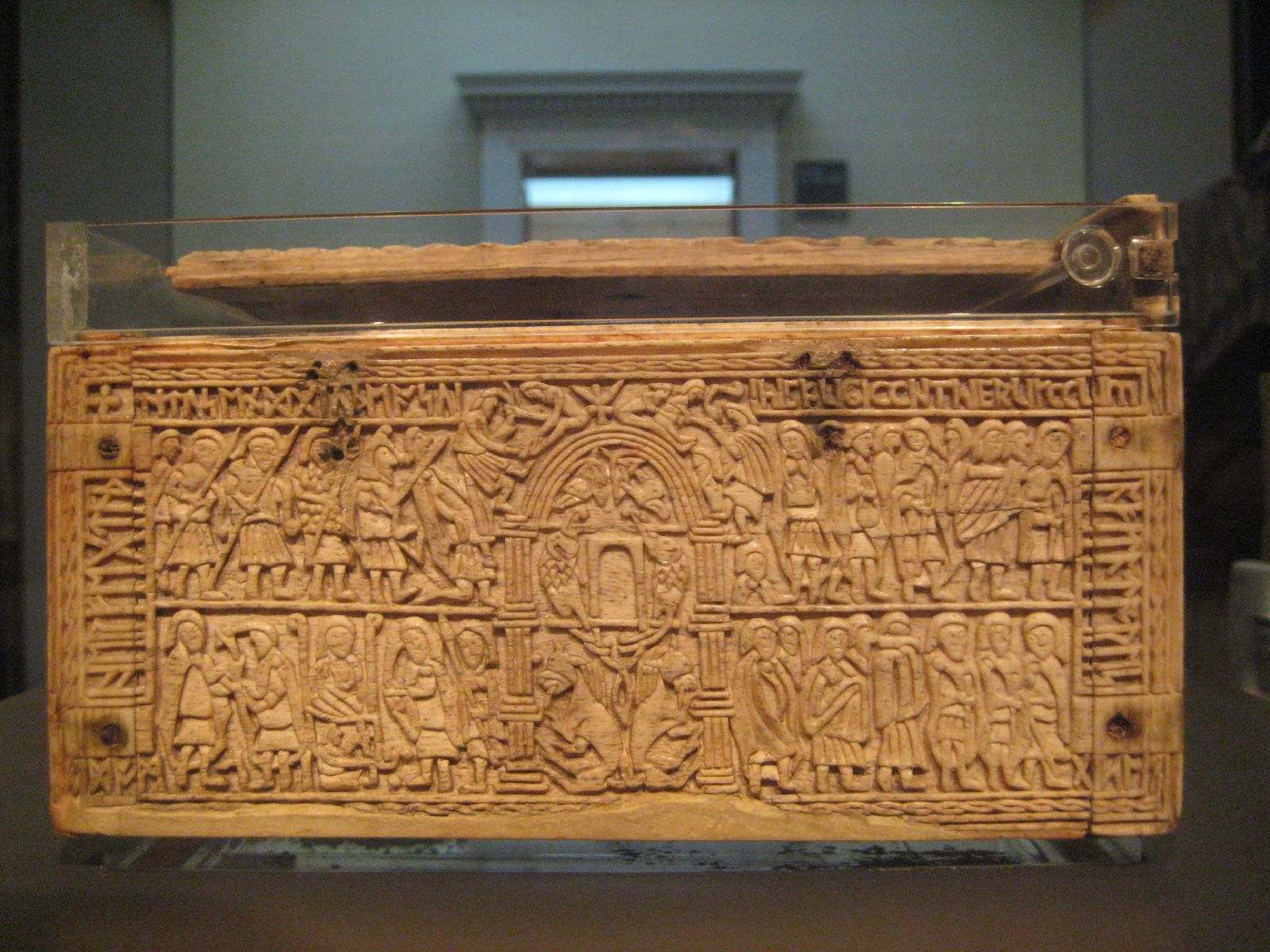
Rear panel of the Franks Casket; Titus takes Jerusalem.

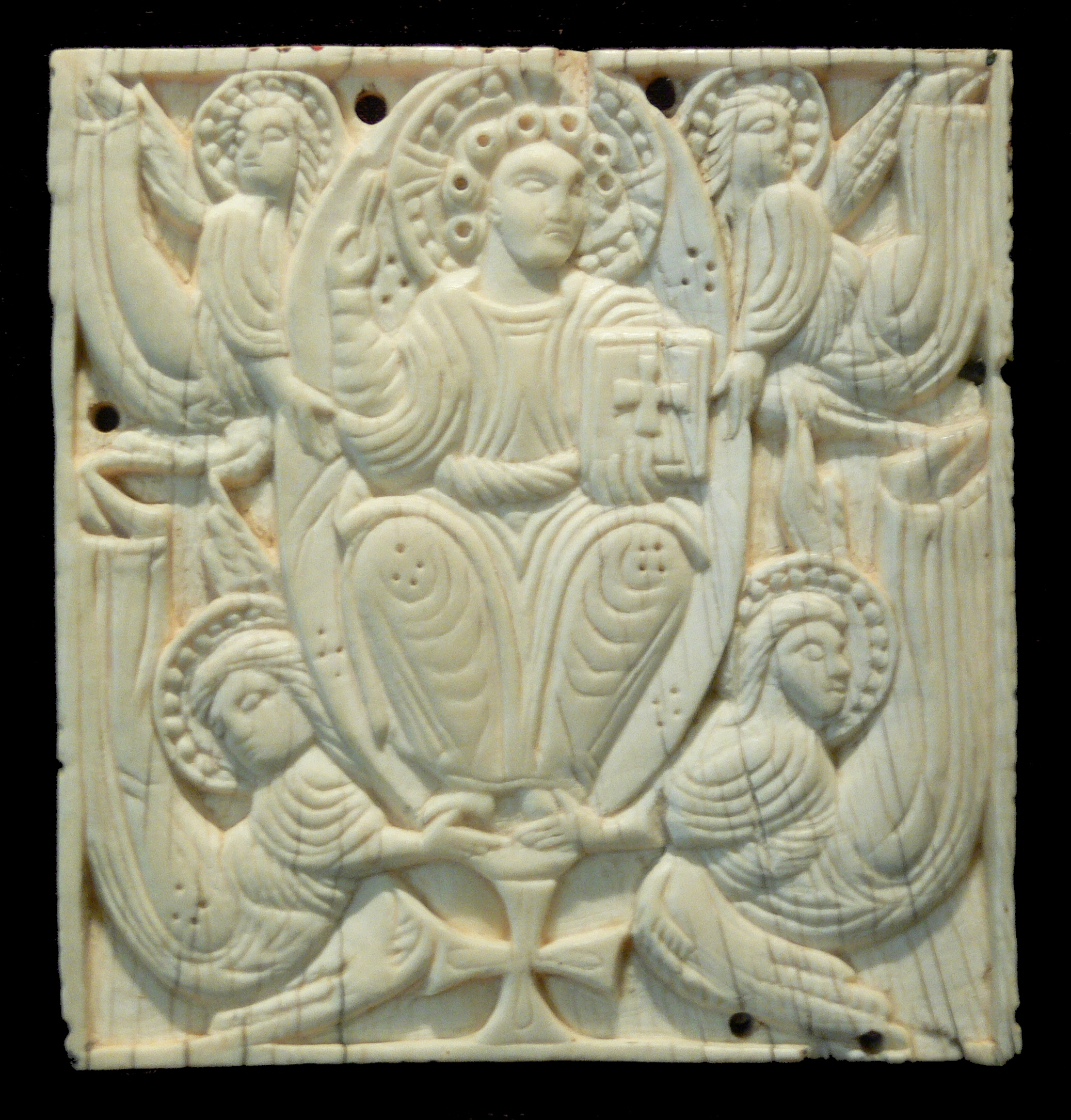
8th century plaque from ?a book cover

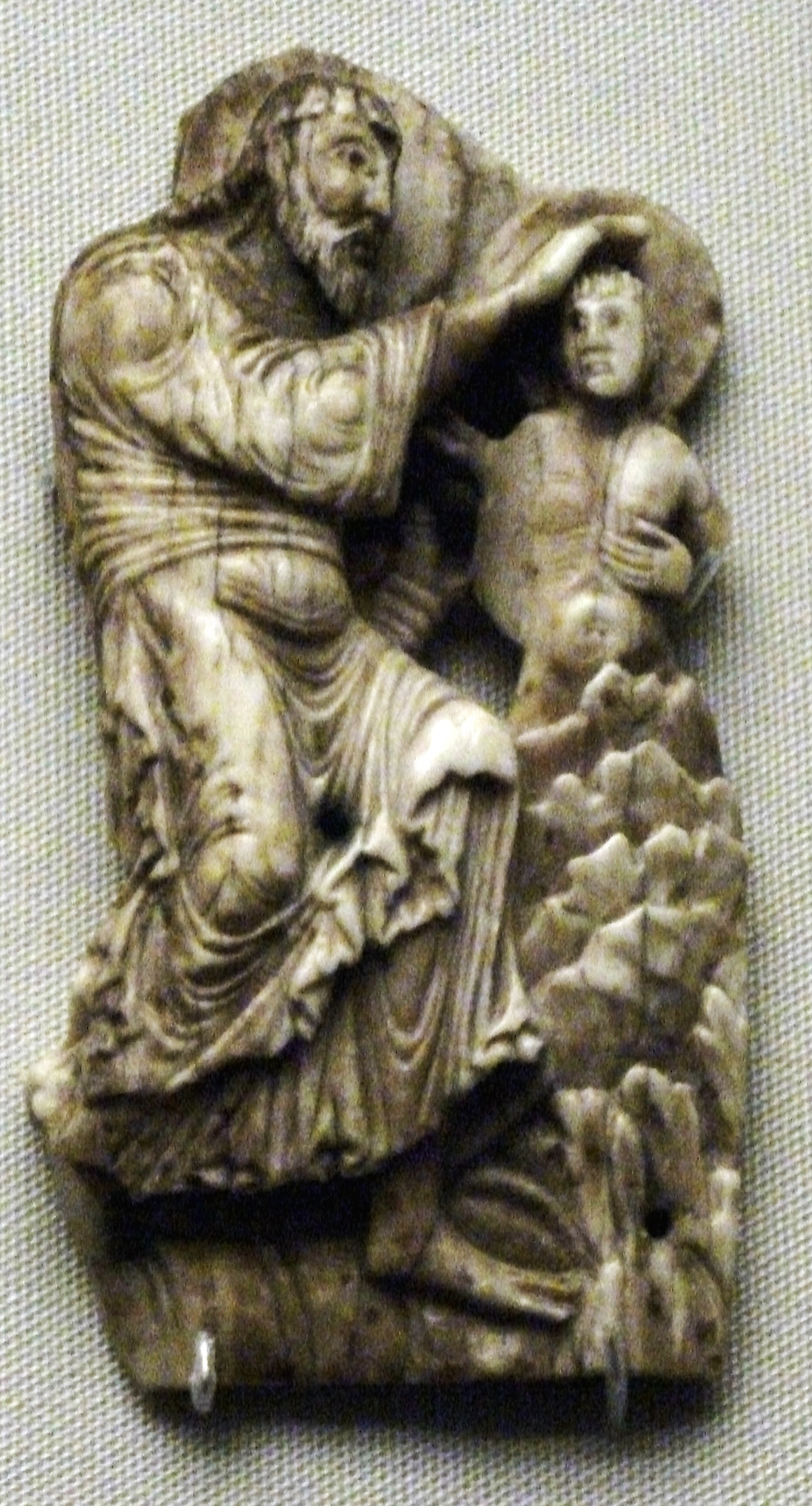
Baptism of Christ, Winchester style

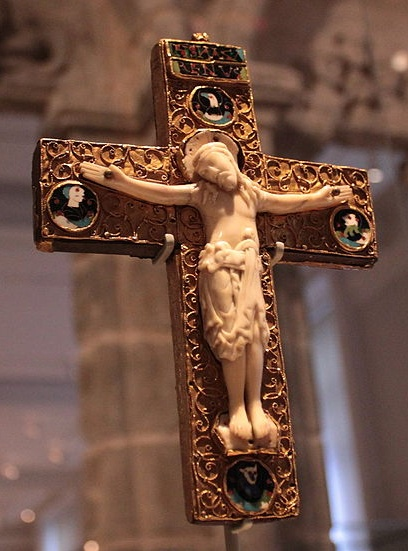
10th century Anglo-Saxon reliquary cross "corpus" on a German cross

== Textile art ==
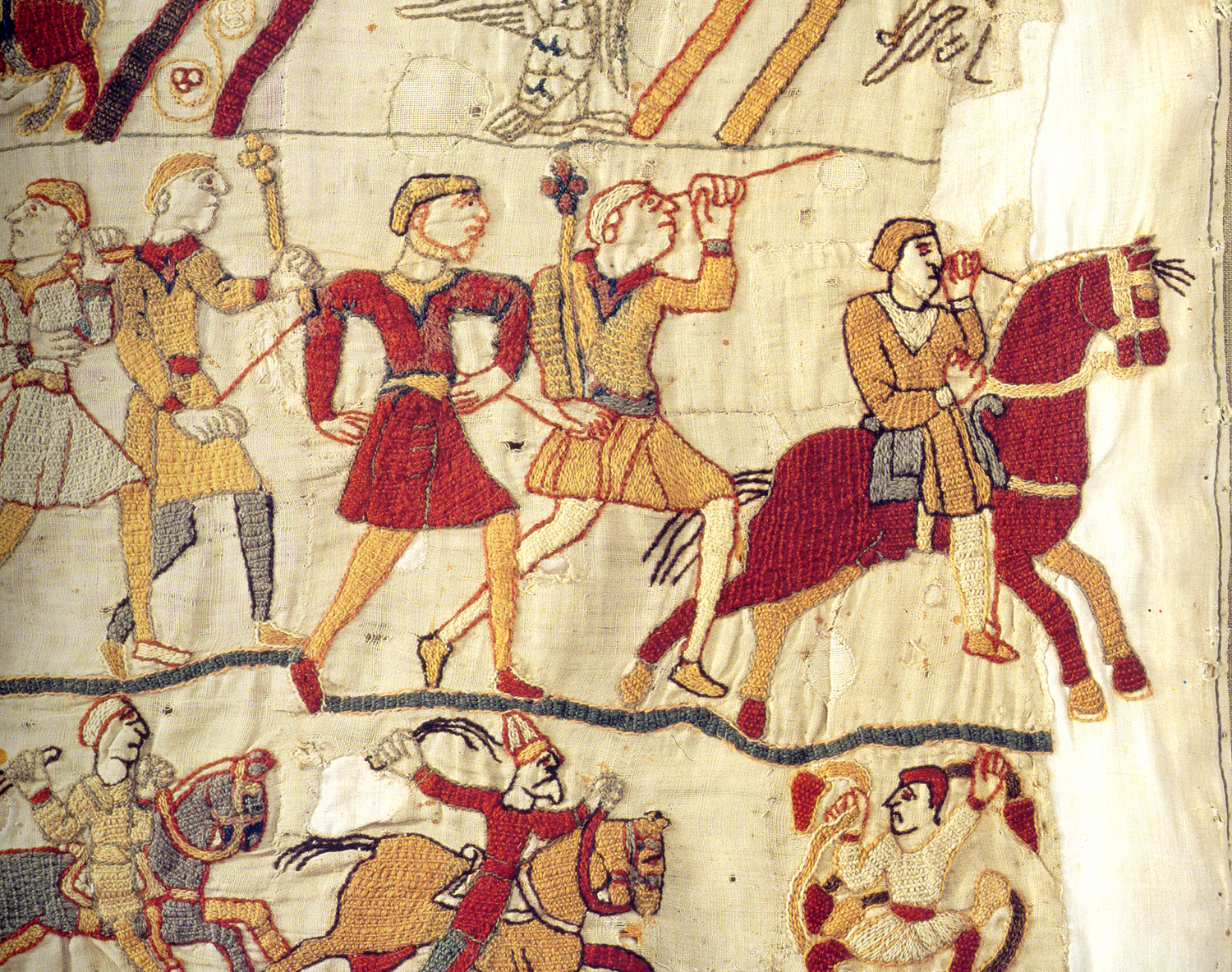
The English army flee, the final surviving scene of the Bayeux Tapestry.

The textile arts of embroidery and "tapestry", Opus anglicanum, were apparently those for which Anglo-Saxon England was famous throughout Europe by the end of the period, but there are only a handful of survivals, probably partly because of the Anglo-Saxon love of using threads in precious metal, making the work valuable for scrap.

The Bayeux Tapestry is embroidered in wool on linen and shows the story of the Norman conquest of England; it is surely the best known Anglo-Saxon work of art, and though made after the Conquest was both made in England and firmly in an Anglo-Saxon tradition, points now accepted by French art-historians. Such tapestries adorned both churches and wealthy houses in England, though at 0.5 by 68.38 metres (1.6 by 224.3 ft, and apparently incomplete) the Bayeux Tapestry must be exceptionally large. Only the figures and decoration are embroidered, on a background left plain, which shows the subject very clearly and was necessary to cover very large areas. It was created using various stitching techniques, most notable of which is its wide use of couching (also known as the Bayeux stitch), in which threads are laid across the fabric and then secured using other, smaller stitches, allowing for color to be applied to large areas. All kinds of textile arts were produced by women, both nuns and laywomen, but many were probably designed by artists in other media. Byzantine silks were available, though certainly expensive, in Anglo-Saxon England, and a number of pieces have been found used in burials and reliquaries. Probably, as in later vestments, these were often married with locally embroidered borders and panels. If we had more Anglo-Saxon survivals, Byzantine influences would no doubt be apparent.

The most highly valued embroideries were very different, fully worked in silk and gold of silver thread, and sometimes with gems of various sorts sewn in. These were used for vestments, altar-cloths and other church uses, and similar roles in the homes of the elite. Only a few pieces have survived, including three pieces at Durham placed in the coffin of St Cuthbert, probably in the 930s, after being given by King Athelstan; they were made in Winchester between 909 and 916. These are works "of breathtaking brilliance and quality", according to Wilson, including figures of saints, and important early examples of the Winchester style, though the origin of their style is a puzzle; they are closest to the wall-painting fragment from Winchester mentioned above, and an early example of acanthus decoration.

The earliest group of survivals, now re-arranged and with the precious metal thread mostly picked out, are bands or borders from vestments, incorporating pearls and glass beads, with various types of scroll and animal decoration. These are probably 9th century and now in a church in Maaseik in Belgium. A further style of textile is a vestment illustrated in a miniature portrait of Saint Aethelwold in his Benedictional (see above), which shows the edge of what appears to be a huge acanthus "flower" (a term used in several documentary records) covering the wearer's back and shoulders. Other written sources mention other large-scale compositions.

== Other materials ==
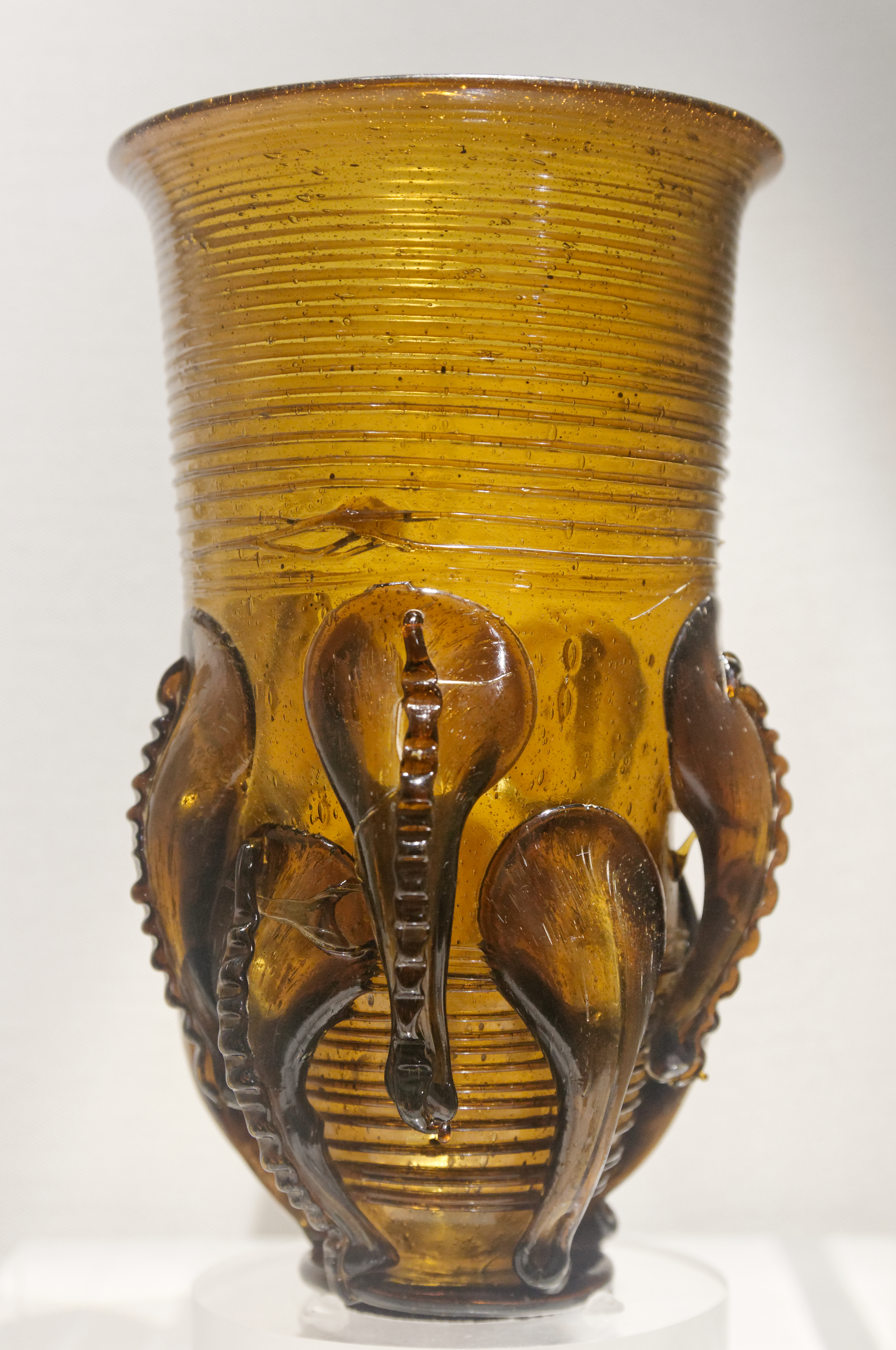
Claw beaker in glass

Anglo-Saxon glass was mostly made in simple forms, with vessels always in a single colour, either clear, green or brown, but some fancy claw beakers decorated with large "claw" forms have survived, mostly broken; these forms are also found in northern continental Europe. Beads, common in early female burials, and some ecclesiastical window glass was more brightly coloured, and several monastic sites have evidence of glass production. Vessel and bead production probably continued, at a much lower level, from the Romano-British industry, but Bede records that Benedict Biscop brought glass-makers from Gaul for window glass at his monasteries. It is not clear how much Anglo-Saxon glass was imported, but canes of millefiori coloured glass almost certainly were; one of these was in the purse at Sutton Hoo. Otherwise recycling of Roman glass may have avoided the need to import raw glass; evidence for the production of this is slender. Glass is sometimes used as a substitute for garnet in jewellery, as in some pieces from Sutton Hoo. Enamel was used, most famously in the Alfred Jewel, where the image sits under carved rock crystal, both materials are extremely rare in surviving Anglo-Saxon work.

The unique decorated leather cover of the small Northumbrian St Cuthbert Gospel, the oldest Western bookbinding to survive unaltered, can be dated to 698 or shortly before. It uses incised lines, some colours, and relief decoration built up over cord and gesso or leather pieces. Larger prestige manuscripts had metalwork treasure bindings, several of which are mentioned, but there may well have been much decorated leatherwork for secular satchels, purses, belts and the like, which contemporaries did not bother to mention and which represents a gap in our knowledge for the early medieval period throughout Europe.

== Aftermath ==
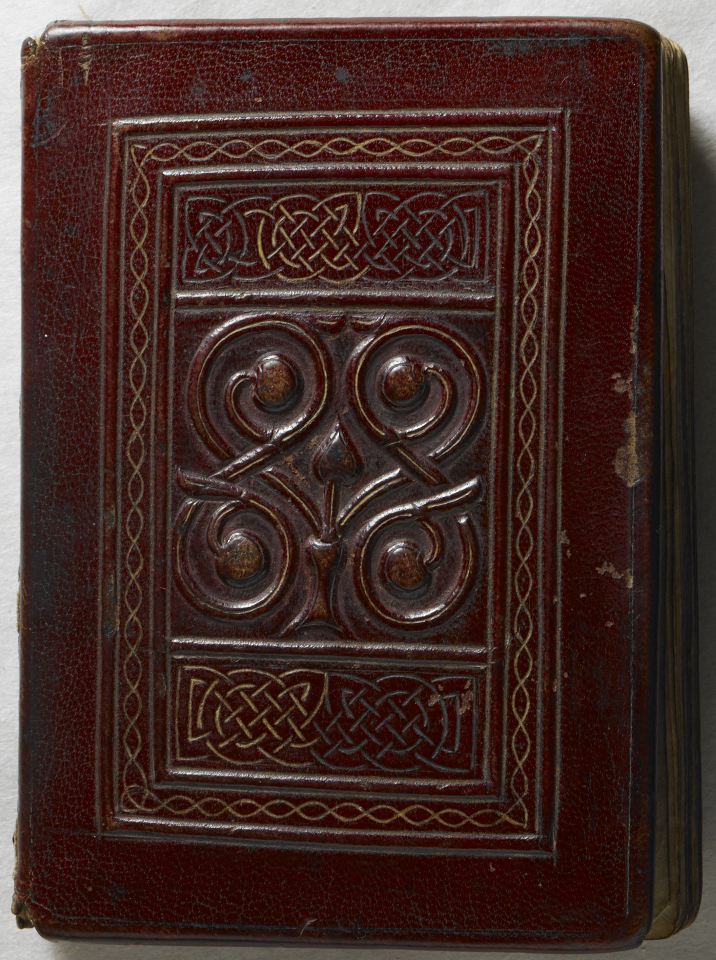
The front cover of the St Cuthbert Gospel, 690s; the original tooled red goatskin binding is the earliest surviving Western bookbinding

Relatively little art survives from the rest of the century after 1066, or at least is confidently dated to that period. The art of Normandy was already under heavy Anglo-Saxon influence, but the period was one of massive despoliation of the churches by the small new ruling class, who had almost entirely dispossessed the old Anglo-Saxon elite. Under these circumstances little significant art was produced, but when it was, the style often showed a slow development of Anglo-Saxon styles into a fully Romanesque version. The attribution of many individual objects has jumped around across the boundary of the Norman Conquest, especially for sculpture, including ivories. A number of objects are claimed for their period by both the "Golden Age of Anglo-Saxon Art" and the "English Romanesque art: 1066–1200" exhibition catalogues, despite both being published in 1984. These include the ivory triangle mount with angels and the "Sigurd" stone relief fragment (discussed above), both from Winchester, and the ivory "pen-case" and Baptism (illustrated above), both in the British Museum.

The energy, love of complicated twining ornament, and refusal to wholly respect a dignified classical decorum that are displayed in both Insular and Winchester school art had already influenced continental style, as discussed above, where it provided an alternative to the heavy monumentality that Ottonian art displays even in small objects. This habit of mind was an essential component of both the Romanesque and Gothic styles, where forms of Anglo-Saxon invention such as the inhabited and historiated initials became more important than they ever had in Anglo-Saxon art itself, and works like the Gloucester Candlestick (c. 1110) show the process in other media.

Anglo-Saxon iconographical innovations include the animal Hellmouth, the ascending Christ shown only as a pair of legs and feet disappearing at the top of the image, the horned Moses, St John the Evangelist standing at the foot of the cross and writing, and God the Father creating the world with a pair of compasses. All of these were later used across Europe. The earliest developed depiction of the Last Judgement in the West is also found on an Anglo-Saxon ivory, and a late Anglo-Saxon Gospel book may show the earliest example of Mary Magdalene at the foot of the cross in a Crucifixion. The Junius manuscript opens with the earliest known image of the Fall of the Rebel Angels. Several images in the Old English Hexateuch are believed to be the earliest surviving visual representations of the Horns of Moses, an iconographic convention which grew over the rest of the Middle Ages.

== See also ==
- Medieval art
- Viking art
- Migration Period art
- List of illuminated Anglo-Saxon manuscripts
- Anglo-Saxon architecture
- Anglo-Saxon literature
- Anglo-Saxon glass
