= Imperial Cross =

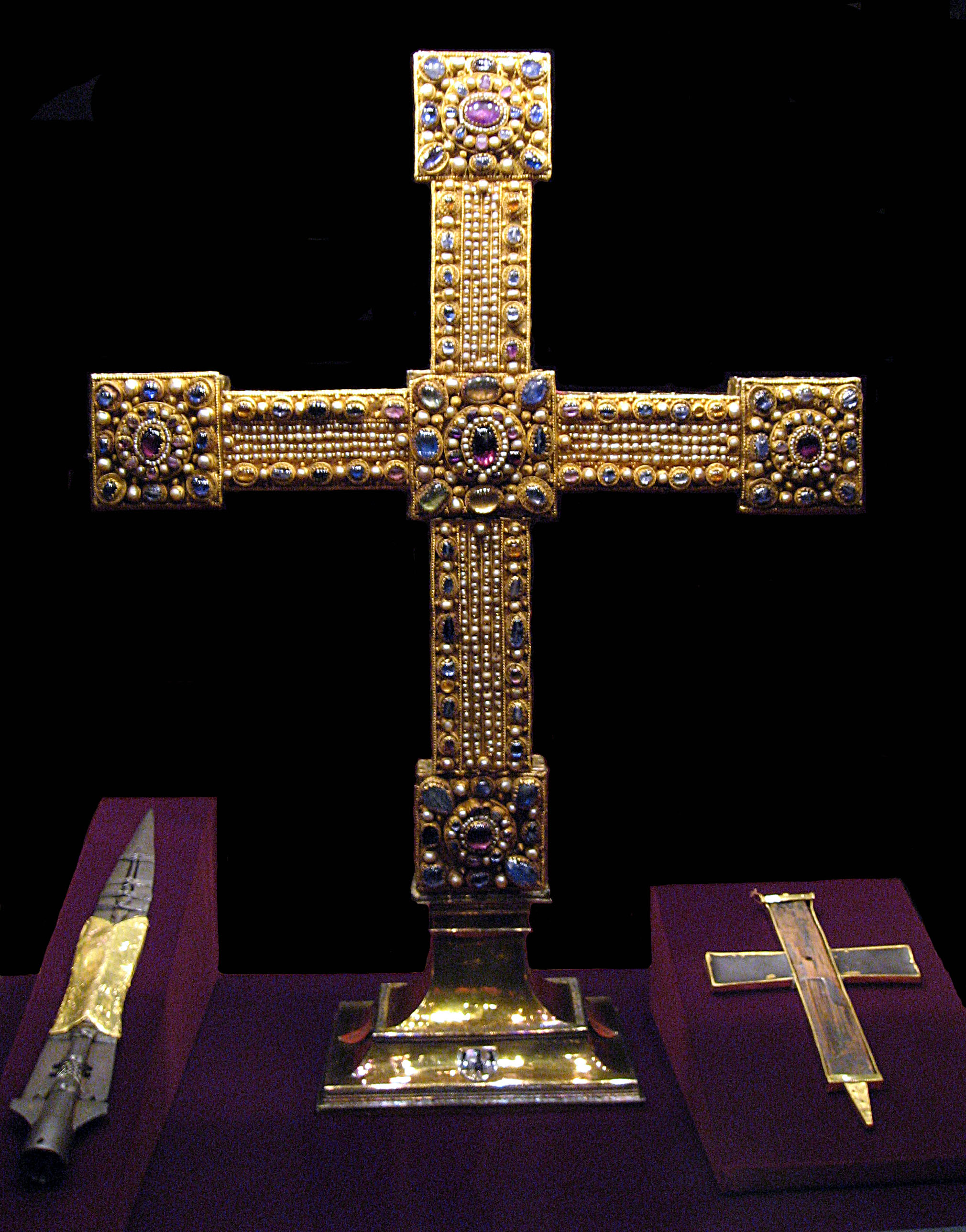
The Imperial Cross with the Holy Lance (left) and the reliquary of the true cross (right) in the Imperial Treasury, Vienna

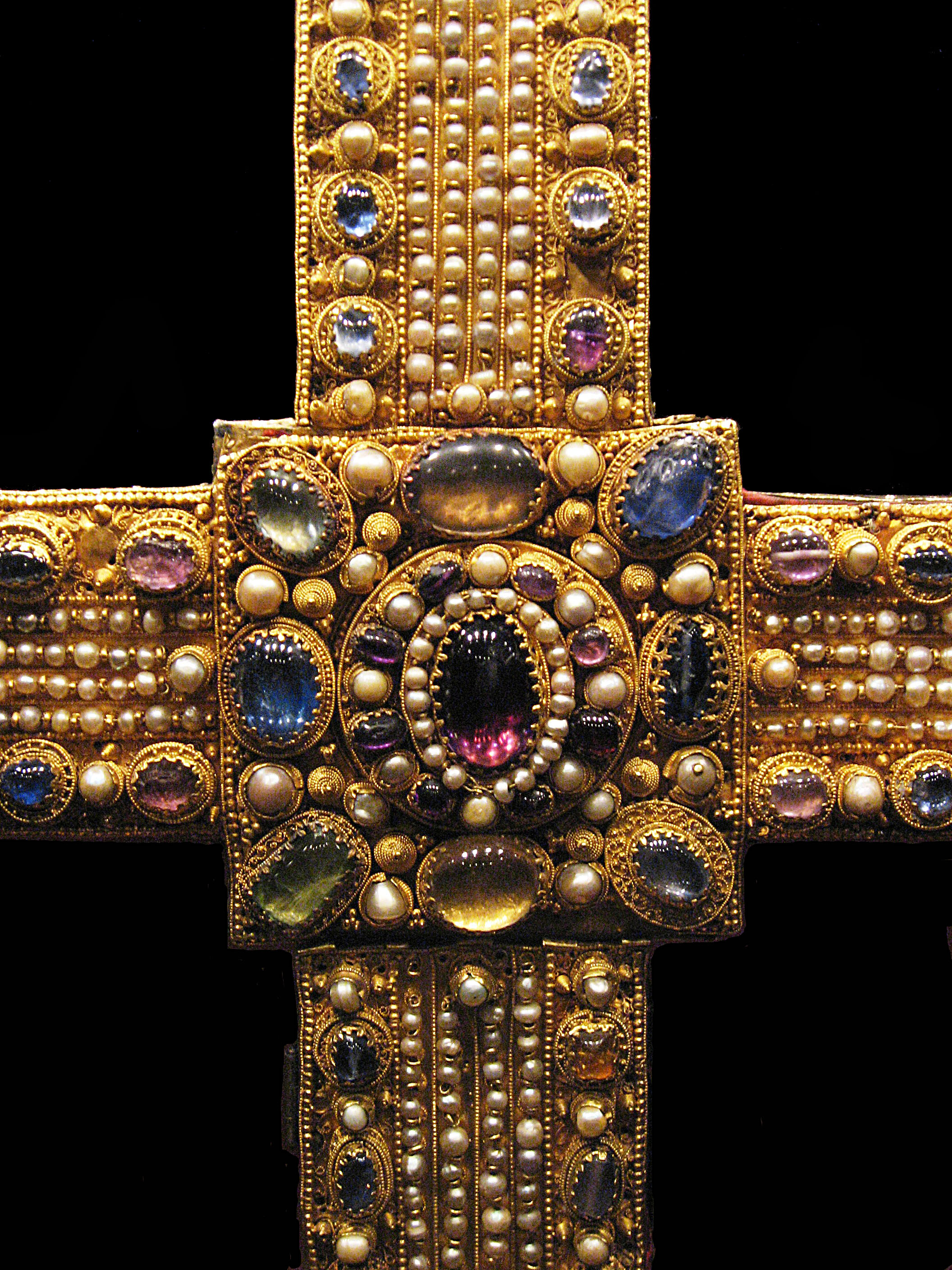
Close up of the Imperial Cross

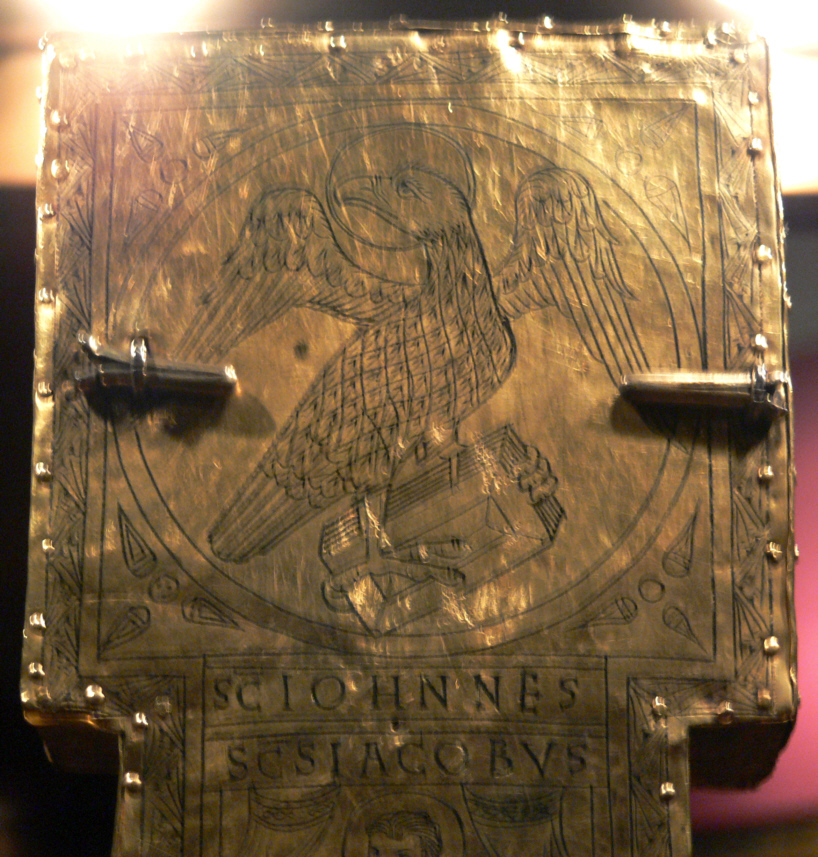
Niello eagle of Saint John the Evangelist on the back

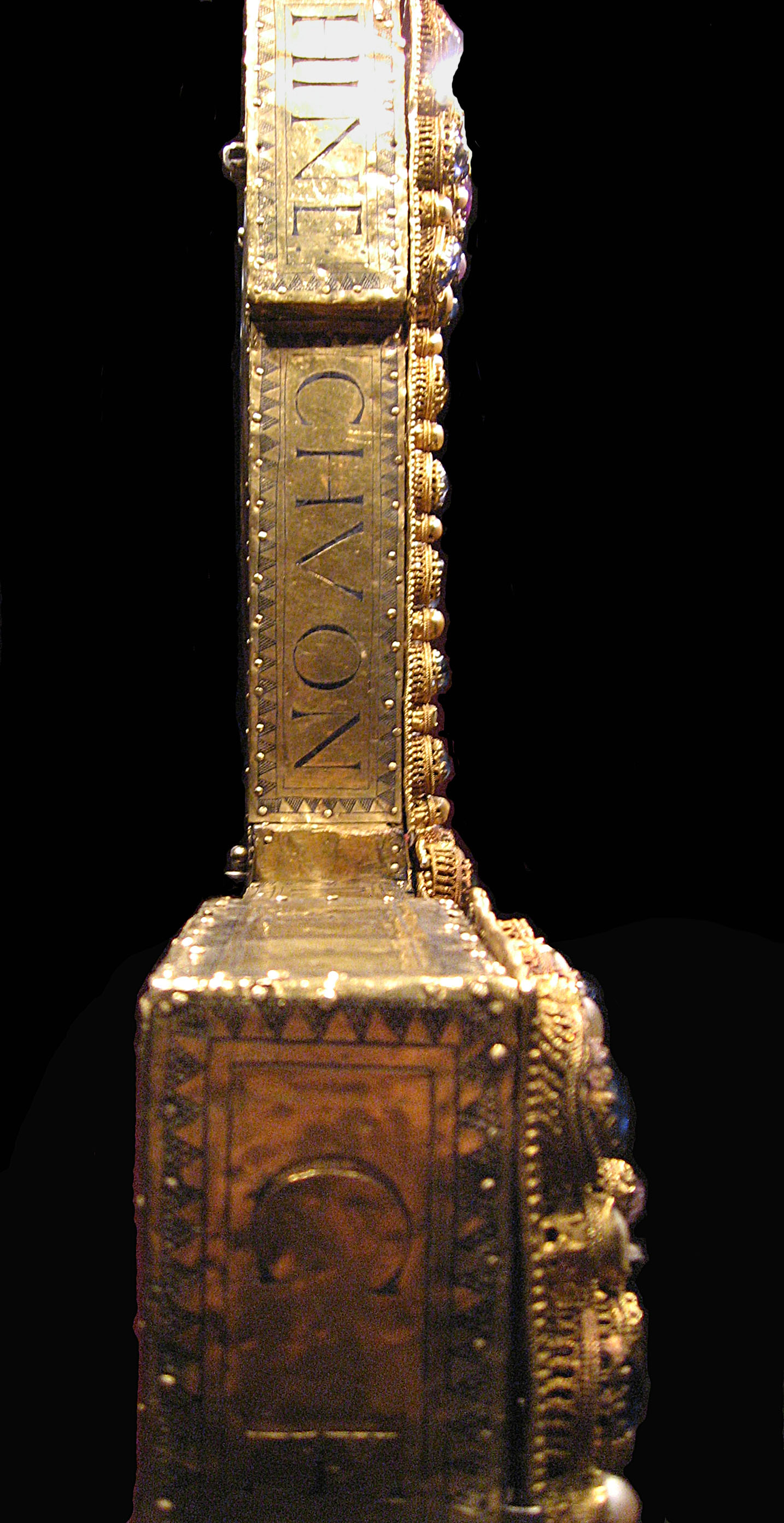
Side view, showing the inscription

The Imperial Cross (Latin: Cross Imperatoria, German: Reichskreuz) is part of the Imperial Regalia of the Holy Roman Empire. It served as the container for the two "Great Relics of Christ" (Perveniens Reilquias magna Christi, Großen Reliquien Christi): the Holy Lance in its horizontal arms and the reliquary of the True Cross in the lower shaft. It is thus the original reliquary of the Imperial relics. The Imperial cross is kept in the Imperial Treasury in the Hofburg. It has been suggested that the cross was probably created some time around 1024–25 or 1030 in Lotharingia. A somewhat earlier creation as a commission of Conrad's predecessor Henry II (1002–1024) is also found in scholarly literature.

An older base was replaced with the current gilt silver base of the cross in 1350 in Prague at the command of Charles IV. In addition he had new reliquaries made for the relics which had hitherto been stored inside the Imperial Cross.

== Description ==
The cross has an oak core which is coated on the outside with gold leaf and with red leather on the inside. It measures 77 by 70 centimetres. The beams are 9 centimetres wide for most of their length and 12 cm wide at the ends of the beams.

The front of the cross is decorated with pearls and gemstones in high mountings (Crux gemmata). The reverse, decorated in the niello technique, depicts the Agnus Dei (Lamb of God) at the centre of the cross, surrounded by the twelve Apostles and the symbols of the Four Evangelists at the cross' four ends.

Because it was created as a reliquary, several parts of the front side can lift off, which reveals openings through which the relics can be reached. The openings are lined with dark red material and are an exact fit for the Holy Lance and the reliquary of the True Cross. The dimensions of the cross result from these relics. There are other small, rectangular openings as well; whether these are for documents or other smaller relics is unknown.

The following inscription runs around the sides:

ECCE : CRVCEM : DOMINI : FVGIAT : PARS : HOSTIS : INIQVI : † HINC : CHVONRADI : TIBI : CEDANT : OMNES : INIMICI :
Lo! May the hostile faction of evil flee the cross of the Lord † Thus may all of the evil ones surrender to you, Chuonrad.

"Chuonrad" refers to Conrad II, in whose reign the cross was probably made. It is not known whether he commissioned the cross. Viewing the cross as a symbol of victory rather than an instrument of suffering is typical of the High Middle Ages and occurs often in Romanesque art. It is, therefore, also a symbol of the Imperial claim to universal rule.

The base of the cross is a later addition, made of gilt silver with a wooden core and decorated with four enamelled coats of arms. The shields on the front and back show the single-headed, right-facing Imperial Eagle, while the silver Bohemian lion is shown on a red background on the two sides. This base is 17.3 cm high and 29.2 x 22 cm wide.

== Bibliography ==
- Hermann Fillitz. Die Insignien und Kleinodien des Heiligen Römischen Reiches. Wien und München 1954
- Gesellschaft für staufische Geschichte (Ed.), Die Reichskleinodien, Herrschaftszeichen des Heiligen Römischen Reiches. Göppingen 1997 ISBN 3-929776-08-1
- Jan Keupp, Hans Reither, Peter Pohlit, Katharina Schober, Stefan Weinfurter (Eds.), "… die keyserlichen zeychen …" Die Reichskleinodien – Herrschaftszeichen des Heiligen Römischen Reiches, Regensburg 2009, ISBN 978-3-7954-2002-4.
- Sabine Haag (Ed.), Meisterwerke der Weltlichen Schatzkammer, Kunsthistorisches Museum, Wien, 2009, ISBN 978-3-85497-169-6.
