= Hubert de Vaux =

Hubert de Vaux may relate to:

- Hubert I de Vaux, created Baron of Gilsland in 1157, by King Henry II of England. Died circa 1164.
- Hubert II de Vaux, 5th Baron of Gilsland, whose daughter and heiress Maud passed the barony of Gilsland to the Multon family.
