= Ranulf =

- Gender: Masculine
- Language: English, Old French, Old Occitan

Origin
- Languages: West Germanic, Old Norse, Gothic
- Origin: Raginolf / Raginulf / Reginúlfr / Ramnulf / Ramnolf
- Derivation: ragin / reginn or hrabns + ulf / úlfr / wulfs
- Meaning: "advice", "decision" or "raven" + "wolf"

Ranulf is a historical masculine given name in Old French and Old Occitan, and is a masculine given name in the English language. Ranulf was introduced into England by the Norman conquest or alternatively is said to have been introduced to Scotland and northern England, by Scandinavian settlers in Early Middle Ages. However, most earliest historical figures with this name originated on the continent. It is derived from the West Germanic name Raginulf, Raginolf. This West Germanic personal name is composed of two elements: the first, RAGN > ragin, means "advice", "decision"; the second element, (w)ulf / (w)olf, means "wolf". or alternatively the Old Norse name Reginúlfr is based on the Old Norse variant forms reginn and úlfr. The Old Occitan anthroponym Ranulf (Ramnulf, Rannulf) does not contain exactly the same first element, but hram, short form of Gothic hrabns "raven".

== People ==
- Ranulf II of Alife, 12th-century Italo-Norman nobleman
- Ranulf I of Aquitaine (820–866), Frankish noble
- Ranulf II of Aquitaine (850–890), Frankish noble
- Ranulf de Briquessart (1046–1089), Norman magnate
- Ranulf de Broc, 12th-century Anglo-Norman nobleman
- Ranulf I of Caiazzo (died 1088), Count of Caiazzo
- Ranulf de Blondeville, 6th Earl of Chester (1170–1232), Anglo-Norman nobleman
- Ranulf de Gernon, 4th Earl of Chester (1099–1153), Anglo-Norman baron
- Ranulf le Meschin, 3rd Earl of Chester (1074–1129), Norman magnate
- Ranulf Compton (1878–1974), American politician
- Ranulf Flambard (c. 1060 – 1128), Bishop of Durham and royal official
- Ranulf de Vaux of Gilsland, 12th-century English noble
- Ranulf de Glanvill (c. 1112–1190), Chief Justiciar of England
- Ranulf Higden (c. 1280–1364), English chronicler and Benedictine monk
- Ranulf (chancellor), 12th-century Anglo-Norman royal official
- Ranulf I de Soules (died before 1170), Norman knight
- Ranulf fitz Walter, English 11th-century noble
- Ranulf of Wareham, 13th-century Bishop of Chichester

== Fictional characters ==
- Ranulf, character in Fire Emblem: Path of Radiance and its sequel, Fire Emblem: Radiant Dawn.
- Ranulf, an additional natural son of Henry I of England in Sharon Kay Penman's Plantagenet series. The meticulous research for which Penman is noted extends to the names of minor characters. Completely fictional characters in her books are rare and are always identified in her author's notes. They serve as devices to illustrate aspects of medieval life, to reveal information, or to bridge gaps in knowledge, especially when such revelations would be out of character for the historical figures in her novels.

== See also ==
- Ranulph
