= Pentney Hoard =

Anglo-Saxon treasure in Norfolk

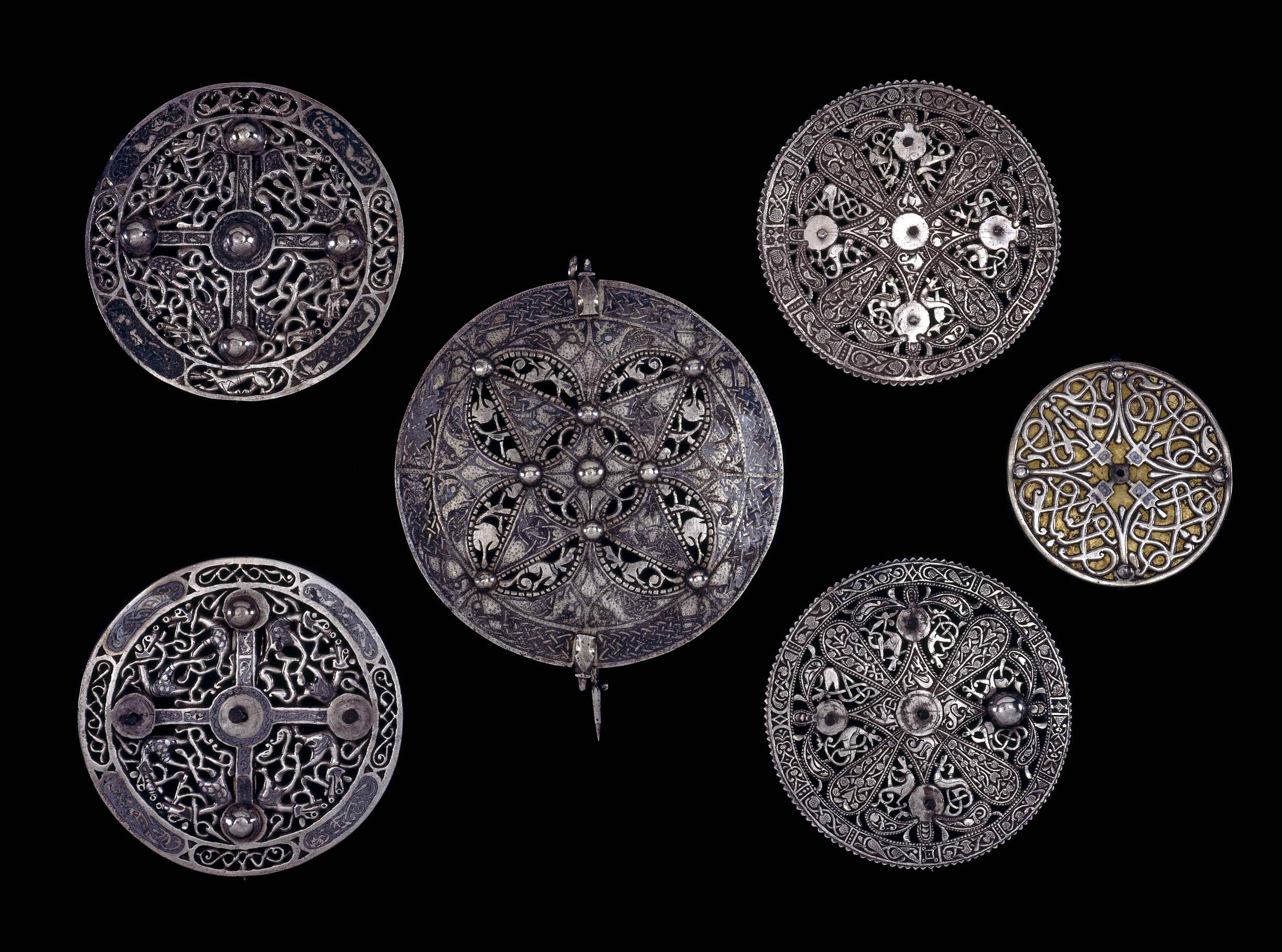
- Material: Silver, copper alloy
- Created: Late 8th to early 9th century
- Period/culture: Anglo-Saxon
- Discovered: 1978
- Place: Pentney, Norfolk, England
- Present location: British Museum

The Pentney Hoard is an Anglo-Saxon jewellery hoard, discovered by a gravedigger in a Pentney, Norfolk churchyard in 1978. The treasure consists of six silver openwork disc brooches, five made entirely of silver and one composed of silver and copper alloy. The brooches are decorated in the 9th century Trewhiddle style. The hoard is now in the British Museum.

== Description ==
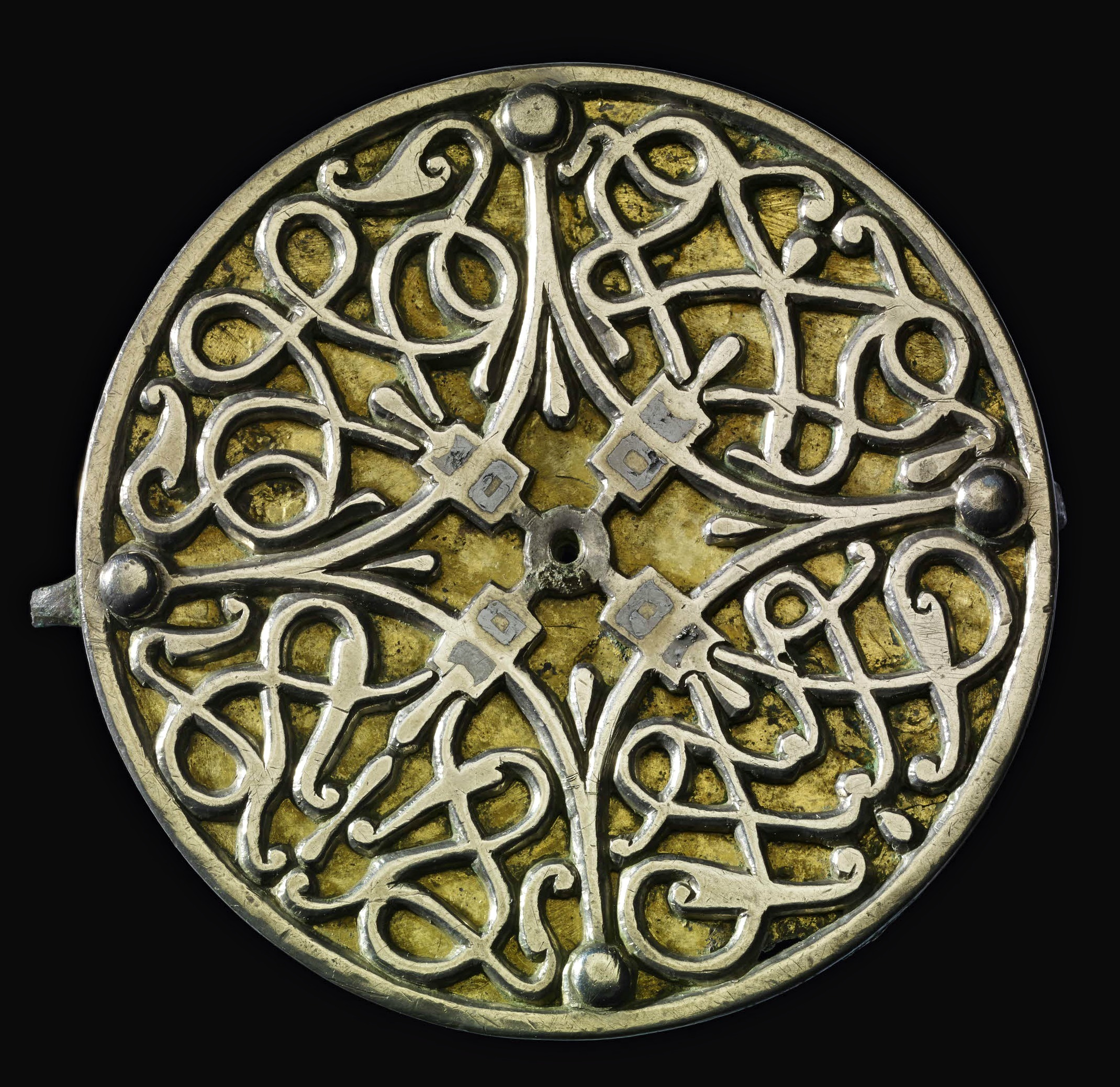
Pentney brooch, 6.1 cm, British Museum

The hoard consists of six silver, circular brooches. Five of the brooches are made entirely of silver; the sixth brooch was created with a copper alloy base and a silver overlay. There are two single brooches, which include the largest and smallest items of the hoard, and two non-identical pairs. The pairs are similar in layout but have different decorative details. All brooches are centrally arranged in a cross-shaped pattern. The smallest brooch, stylistically, belongs to the late 8th century. The five larger brooches can be dated to the early ninth century. All items in the hoard are intricately decorated in the Trewhiddle style. (Note: Ninth century art style named after a hoard found in Trewhiddle, Cornwall in 1774.) The brooches were in very good condition when they were discovered. Evidence suggests that all the brooches were made in the same workshop. All of the brooches except for the smallest were complete, with an intact pin, spring and hinge components.

=== Single brooches ===
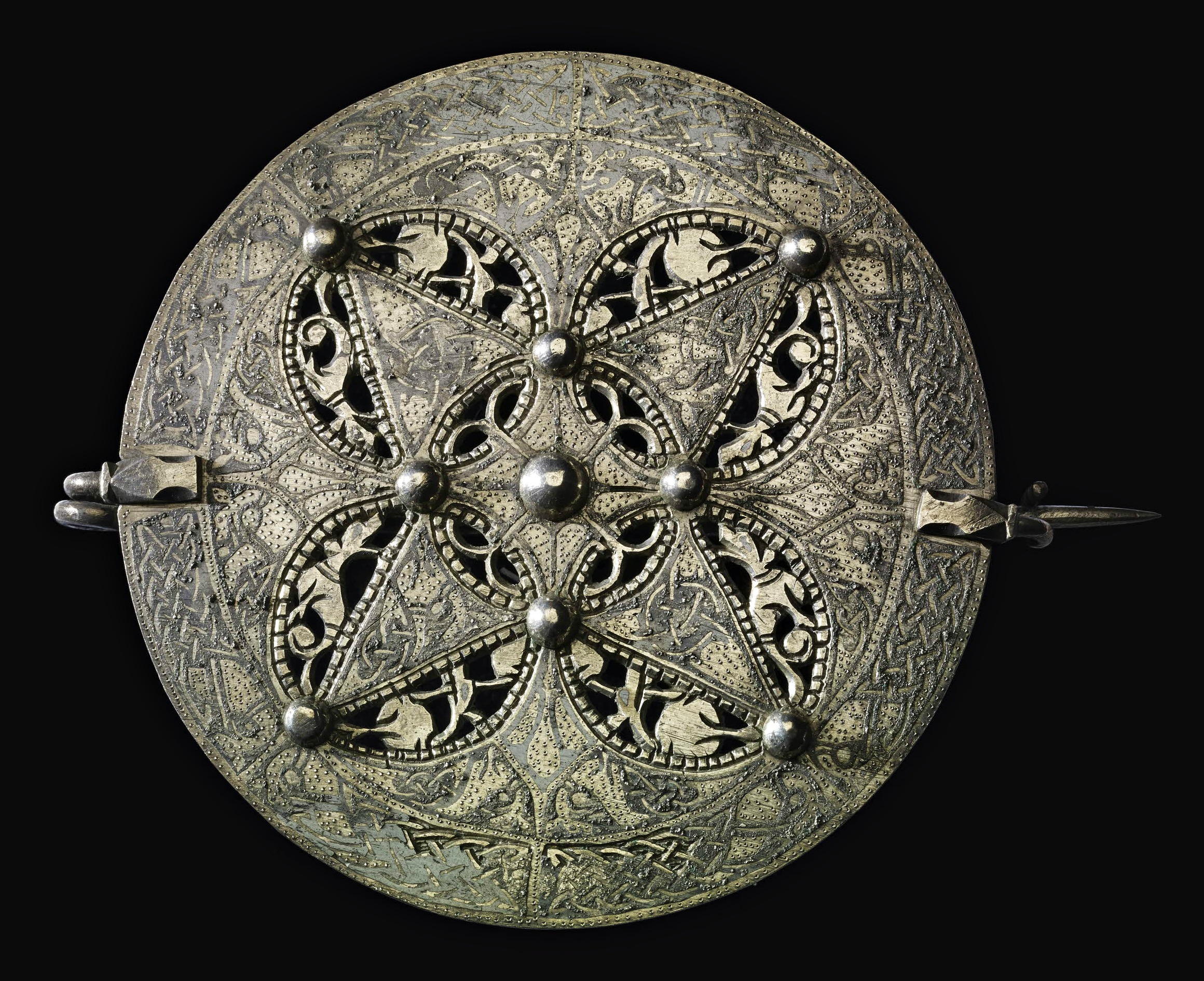
The largest Pentney disc brooch, (10.2 cm), British Museum

The largest brooch is a silver disc with an intricate openwork pattern and inlaid with black niello. This (10.2 centimetres [4.0 in]) brooch is an excellent example of the Trewhiddle style. The outer edge of the brooch contains eight panels of intertwined creatures. The center of the brooch is ornamented with stylised animal and plant decorations. The back of the brooch is undecorated. The pin and spring hardware are intact and decorated with two stylised beasts.

The smallest brooch differs from the other brooches in size, construction and ornamentation. It is constructed with a quincunx of rivets that connect the face to the gilded base plate. The (6.1 centimetres [2.4 in]) brooch consists of an openwork silver sheet metal face with simple decorations of entwined plants, that cover a gilded copper alloy backplate. The back of the brooch is undecorated and the pin hardware is damaged. The smallest brooch appears to be the only brooch that has been worn.

=== Non-identical pairs ===
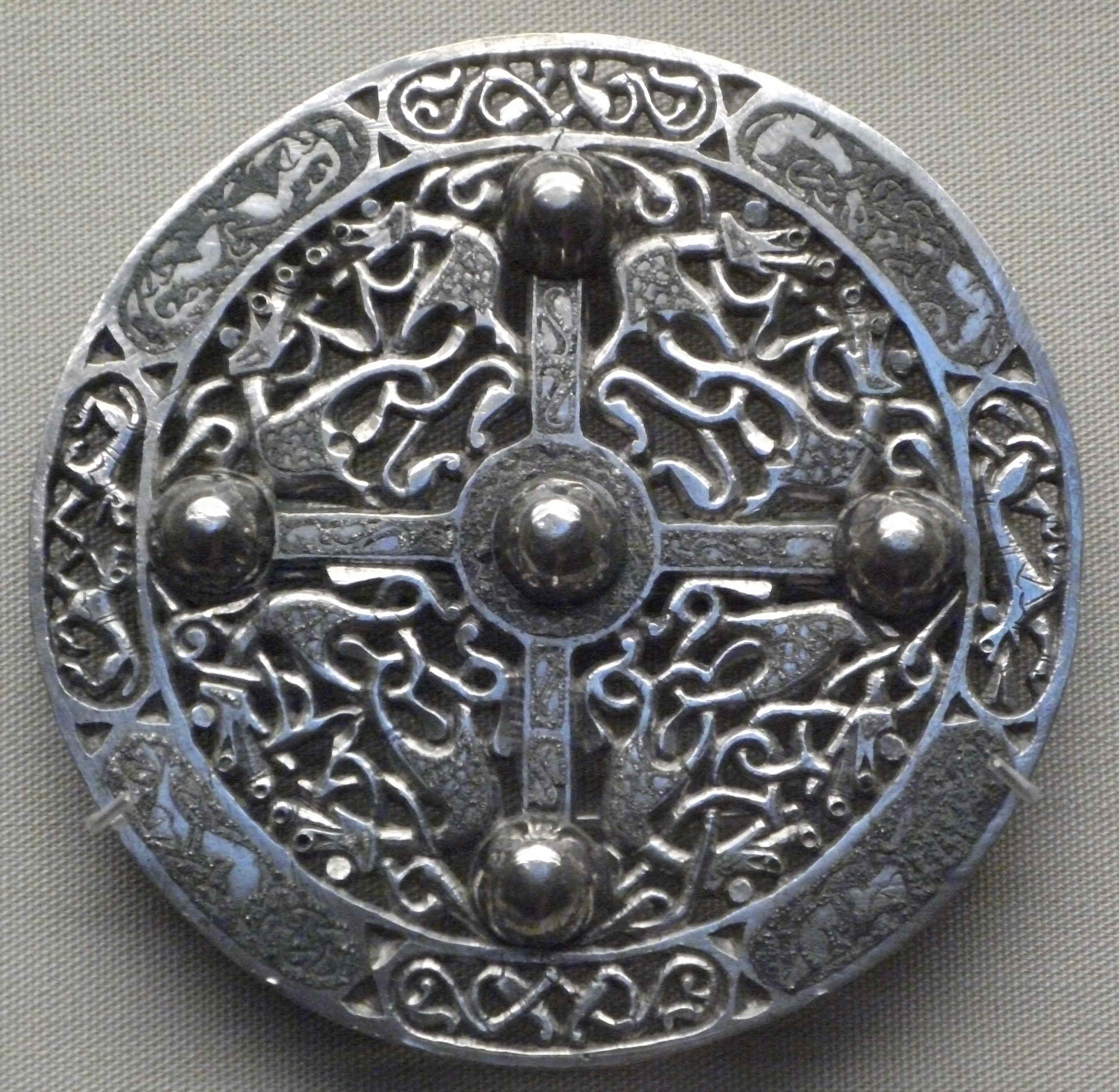
Pentney brooch, 8.5 cm, British Museum

Four of the disc brooches belong to two non-identical pairs. (Note: British Museum IDs. 1980,1008.1, 1980,1008.2, 1980,1008.3, & 1980,1008.4) All four items are made in silver sheet metal with an openwork design. They are embellished with intricate plant, animal and geometric ornamentation in panels surrounding a central cross-shaped area. All of the brooches were originally topped with multiple bossed rivets; many of the bosses are missing.

One set of brooches (8.3 centimetres [3.3 in]) is decorated with scalloped edges and extensive beading. Each brooch of this pair consists of an outer band that is divided into eight sections of plant and geometric shapes. The central area is ornamented with four lobes and multiple panels filled with exotic beasts and stylised plants. The backplates of each item are undecorated, and the riveted pins are intact.

The other brooch pair (8.5 centimetres [3.3 in]) has a simpler openwork design and extensive niello inlay. Each brooch contains an outer band with alternating panels of plant and animal engravings carved into the silver. The central area of the brooch has a simple cross-shaped arrangement with five riveted bosses. The setting is divided into four panels of entangled beasts inlaid with niello.

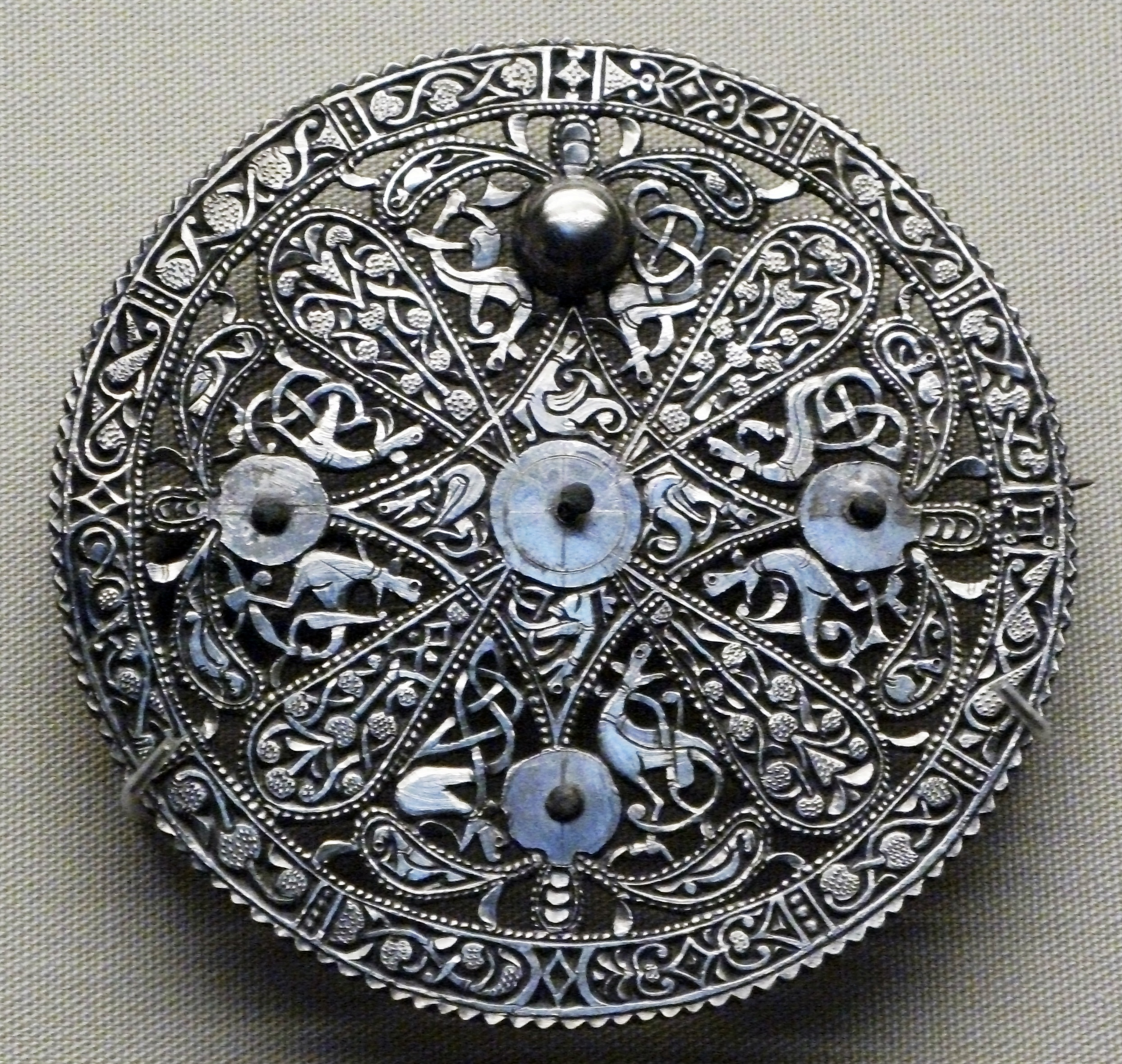
Pentney brooch, (8.3 cm), British Museum

Each brooch of this pair has an undecorated backplate with a riveted pin attachment.

== History ==
In 1978, William King, a sexton for the church of St. Mary Magdalene in Pentney, Norfolk was digging a grave and noticed a circular piece of metal embedded in the soil. In removing the metal, he uncovered five additional metal discs. King gave the artefacts to the church rector who saved them in the parish chest. Three years later, the new church rector, John Wilson, found the discs and gave them to the Norwich Castle museum. The British Museum was asked to evaluate the brooches. It was determined that the hoard items were Anglo-Saxon silver disc brooches. The finds were declared treasure trove and property of the Crown. The hoard contents were purchased by the British Museum. As discoverer of the hoard, King was awarded £137,000, £25,000 of which he gifted to the church.

In 1980, a re-excavation and metal detecting of the original gravesite was undertaken. One silver boss was found and it was suggested that it was a boss from one of the four brooches missing bosses. The 1980 work revealed that the hoard had been uncovered at a depth of less than 1.52 m (5 ft).

The five largest items of the hoard, based on a comparison of similarly styled brooches, were judged to have been made between 800—840 AD. The smallest brooch, also based on style, was believed to be from the late eighth century. It has been proposed by scholars that the hoard could have been buried in the middle of the 9th century, during the Viking raids on East Anglia. There was an alternative suggestion that the placement of the six discs in the churchyard had an unknown reason not connected to the Viking invasion of England.

== Trewhiddle Style ==
Trewhiddle is a 9th-century art style named after the animated decorative elements of the Trewhiddle Hoard. (Note: Hoard found in 1774 near Trewhiddle, Cornwall in a stream bed of an old tin mine.) The discovered treasure contained a number of objects, including Anglo-Saxon coins, a silver chalice, and other gold and silver pieces. Characteristics of the Trewhiddle style are: the use of silver, niello inlay, and zoomorphic, plant and geometric designs, often interlaced and intricately carved into small panels.

== See also ==
- Brooch
- Penrith Hoard
- Anglo-Saxon art
- Strickland Brooch
- Anglo-Saxon brooches
- List of hoards in Great Britain
