= Sowerby Castle, Cumbria =

Castle in Cumbria, England

Sowerby Castle was a castle located at Castle Sowerby, Cumbria, England.

== History ==
The castle was located between Inglewood forest and the Carlisle plains. The castle was first recorded in the 12th century during the reign of King Henry II. Sowerby was granted in 1157 to Ranulf de Vaux, who may have commenced construction of a timber motte and bailey castle. It was then inherited by Robert de Vaux, who was required to pay a fine as he had not declared ownership of the castle for ten years. In 1237, the manor of Castle Sowerby was granted to King Alexander II of Scotland. The parish of Castle Sowerby derives its name from the castle.
