= Eustace de Vaux =

English noble

- Noble family: de Vaux

Eustace de Vaux, also known as Eustace de Vallibus, Lord of Castle Carrock and Hayton, was a prominent 12th-century English noble.

== Biography ==
Vaux was the third son of Hubert I de Vaux, Lord of Gilsland and his wife Grecia. Eustace was granted Castle Carrock and Hayton by his father Hubert, which was later confirmed by his elder brother Robert. He gave a carucate of land in Castle Carrock and Hayton to the Augustinian Lanercost Priory founded by his brother Robert. He was succeeded by his son Adam, with his children taking the surname of "de Castlecarrock".

== Marriage and issue ==
He married Alice, the sister and co-heiress of Robert, son of Bueth, the daughter of Bueth, they had the following issue:

- Adam de Castlecarrock, had issue.
- Isabella de Castlecarrock, married her cousin John de Denton, had issue.
