= Roland I de Vaux of Triermain and Tercrosset =

English noble

Roland de Vaux
- Arms of Vaux of Tryermain: Vert, a bend sinister chequy or and gules.
- Reign: ? - on or after 1212
- Died: on or after 1212
- Noble family: de Vaux

Roland I de Vaux, Lord of Triermain and Tercrosset, (died on or after 1212) was a prominent 12th-century English noble.

== Biography ==
Vaux was the illegitimate son of Ranulf de Vaux, Lord of Triermain and Tercrosset, who later succeeded as Baron of Gilsland. Roland was granted the lands of Triermain and Tercrosset by his father, and those lands were confirmed by his brother Robert. He was a hostage for his brother Robert's debts with King John of England in 1212. Roland was succeeded by his son Alexander.
