= Trewhiddle style =

Style in Anglo-Saxon art

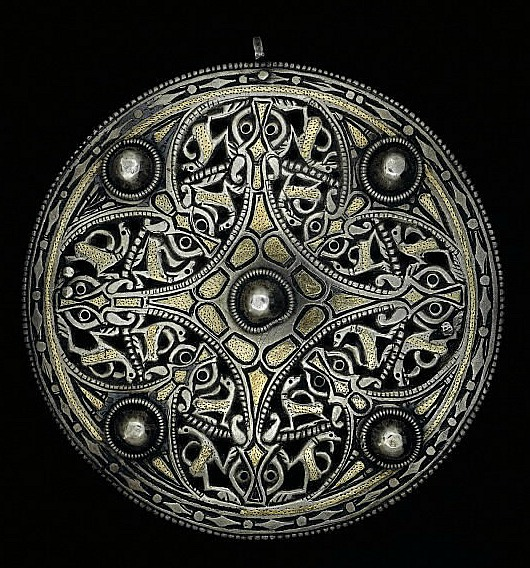
Strickland Brooch, British Museum

Trewhiddle style is a distinctive style in Anglo-Saxon art that takes its name from the Trewhiddle Hoard, discovered in Trewhiddle, Cornwall in 1774. Trewhiddle ornamentation includes the use of silver, niello inlay, and zoomorphic, plant and geometric designs, often interlaced and intricately carved into small panels. Surviving examples are almost all metalwork. Long seen as a style restricted to the 9th century, it now tends to be seen as extending into the 8th and 10th centuries. During the late Anglo-Saxon era, silver was the precious metal most commonly used to create Trewhiddle style jewellery and to decorate weapons. Famous examples include the Pentney Hoard, the Abingdon sword, the Fuller brooch, and the Strickland brooch.

== History ==
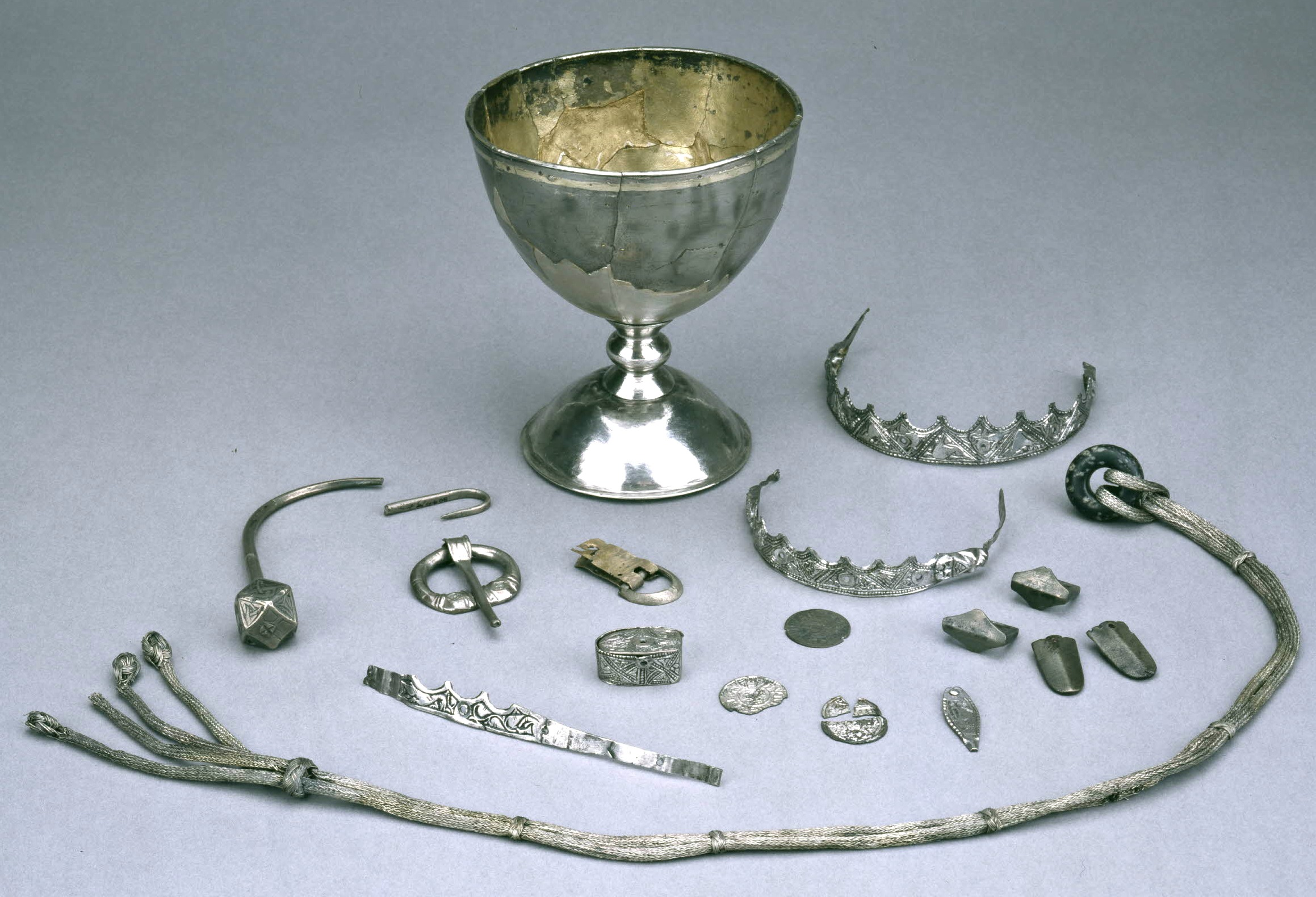
Items of the Trewhiddle Hoard, British Museum

Trewhiddle style is named after the Trewhiddle Hoard found in 1774 near Trewhiddle, Cornwall. The treasure contained a number of objects, including Anglo-Saxon coins, a silver chalice, and other gold and silver pieces. The artefacts can be dated to the ninth century. The animal ornamentation of some of the Trewhiddle Hoard items became a focus of study by Anglo-Saxon art historians and archaeologists in the early twentieth century. Sir Thomas Kendrick was the first historian to illustrate the uninterrupted use of Anglo-Saxon animal ornament, from the last days of Roman Britain to the early Anglo-Saxon period. Danish archaeologist, Johannes Brøndsted, acknowledged the historical importance of the lively decorative elements of the hoard by naming the ninth century style, the "Trewhiddle style".

Trewhiddle style is most likely the outcome of evolving Anglo-Saxon art forms. The Animal style decoration and complex patterns that were found in early England, continued to develop over time. According to David M. Wilson, "If we look at the animal ornament on the metalwork of any period between 450 and 950, we can see the same traditions at work. The animal on the Faversham brooch, the animal on the Sutton Hoo clasps, and the animal on the horse trappings of Källby are in a sequence that leads up to Trewhiddle and beyond."

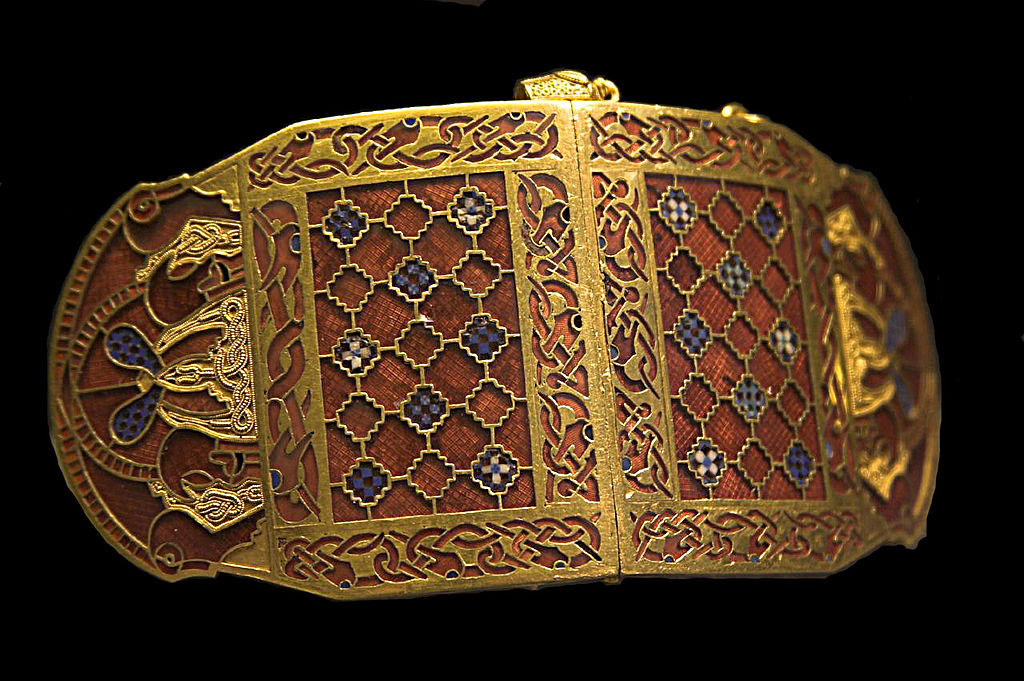
Sutton Hoo shoulder clasp, by c. 620, in an older style.

Art historians have recognized important similarities between Trewhiddle art and Irish art, yet no historian has proposed that Trewhiddle art was influenced by Irish art. It is most likely that the animal art of the Trewhiddle objects originated in England and to a small degree was influenced by Continental art from the Mediterranean, Francia, or Celtic world.

Earlier scholars have theorized that the Trewhiddle style was confined to the ninth century. The style has been difficult to date given the lack of independent dating evidence associated with Trewhiddle finds. It has been suggested, as more Trewhiddle artefacts continue to be found, that the birth of the Trewhiddle style may have occurred in the eighth century. It has also been suggested, given more recent excavation of Trewhiddle style artefacts, including those found at Anglo-Saxon sites in Yorkshire in the 1980s and the late 1990s, that the Trewhiddle style continued to be produced in Northern England into the tenth century. Until more information becomes available to Trewhiddle scholars, the style continues to be dated to the ninth century.

"[Trewhiddle] style has long been recognised as a defining characteristic of much of the ornamental metalwork dated to the 9th century .... During the course of the 9th century, and arguably into the 10th, the Trewhiddle style enjoyed unrivalled prominence in the decoration of high-class metalwork and on the evidence of frequent attempts to copy its motifs in cheaper metals, it was a fashion to which most of the populace aspired."

— Gabor Thomas, 2000.

== Style features ==
The Trewhiddle style is recognized for its intricately carved decoration, including animal, plant, interlace and geometric patterns; niello inlays, densely decorated surfaces, and dome-headed rivets. A defining feature is the dividing of the main area of decoration into small panels, typically separated by beaded borders. Panels usually contain a single motif, typically a crouching, backward-looking or biting animal. Speckling of individual motifs was a technique frequently used to create surface texture or movement.

The animal forms are many, including variations of mythical birds, snakes and beasts, usually depicted in profile. Plant motifs vary from intricately carved individual leaves to complete plants, often combined with animal forms and interlace. Interlace is more commonly seen combined with zoomorphic and plant motifs, rather than on its own. When used singly, the interlace pattern is typically simple and closed. When used with plant or animal forms, the decoration is generally a more complex design.

== Metalwork ==
Trewhiddle style was primarily used to decorate metalwork. During the late Anglo-Saxon era, silver was the precious metal most commonly used to create Trewhiddle style jewellery and to decorate weapons. Viking trade and expansion during the ninth and tenth centuries brought new supplies of silver from the Near East to England and Scandinavia. The rapid change from the use of gold to silver in metalwork manufacturing, was due to abundant new supplies of silver that were made available to craftsmen during this time period. Subsequently, gold became the preferred metal to manufacture finger-rings or for gilding and inlay.

=== Weapons ===
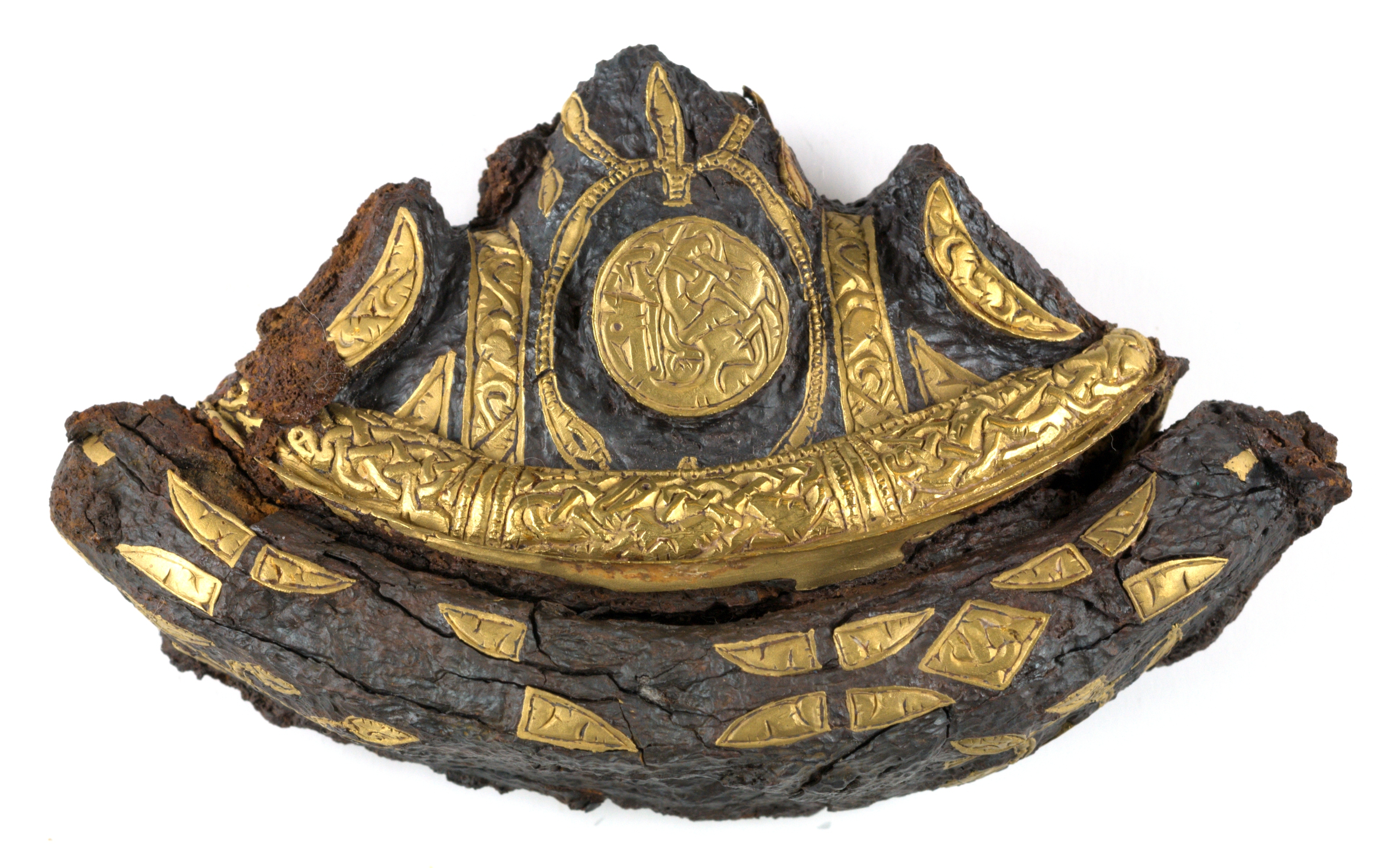
Bedale Hoard sword pommel

Trewhiddle was a commonly used decoration style for late Anglo-Saxon swords. The Abingdon sword, found near the village of Abingdon and now in the Ashmolean Museum, is decorated with silver mounts inlaid with niello. The River Witham sword, has a silver Trewhiddle style hilt is decorated with animal motifs, inlaid with niello.

The sword pommel from the Bedale Hoard, is engraved with panels of gold foil inlay, and decorated with carved, intertwined animals and an intricate gold leaf pattern. The Anglo-Saxon weapon can be dated to the late ninth or early tenth century.

Three sword hilts, all from the Norwegian areas of Høven, Dolven and Gronneberg, were manufactured in the Trewhiddle style, all composed of niello inlays. The Dolven and Gronnenberg hilts are decorated in a similar manner to the River Witham sword. The Høven hilt is decorated with intertwined bird and animal forms, similar in style to the Fuller Brooch.

=== Jewellery ===
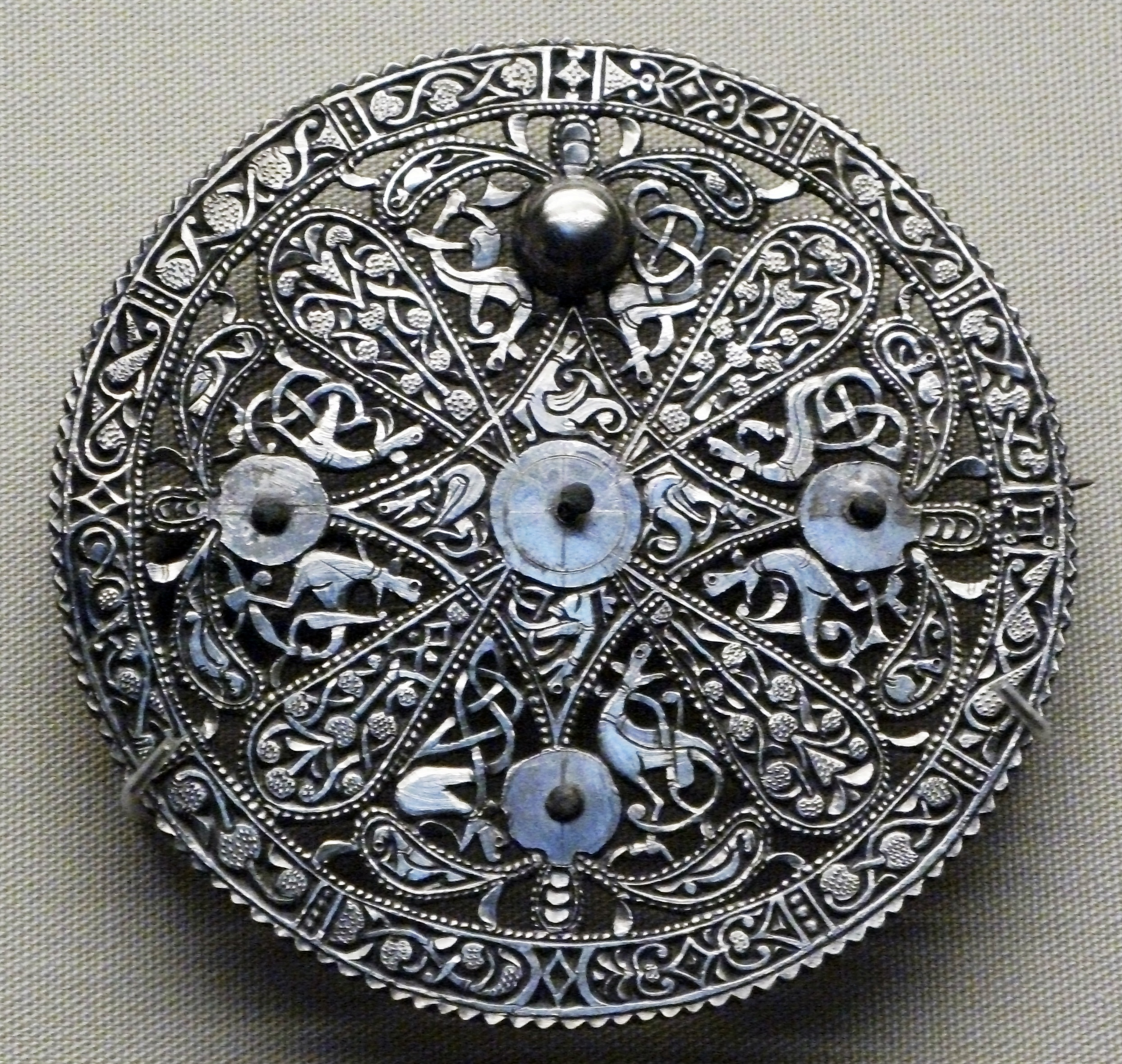
Pentney Hoard brooch

Anglo-Saxon jewellery during the ninth and early tenth century is renowned for its superb craftsmanship and animated, intricately carved designs. Typically cast in silver, open-work disc brooches decorated in the Trewhiddle style are the most recognized examples of late Anglo-Saxon jewellery style.

The Pentney Hoard is probably the best known example of Trewhiddle style. The Anglo-Saxon treasure was discovered in a Pentney, Norfolk churchyard in 1978. The six silver open-work disc brooches, date to the early 9th century, and include two non-identical brooch pairs and two singleton brooches.

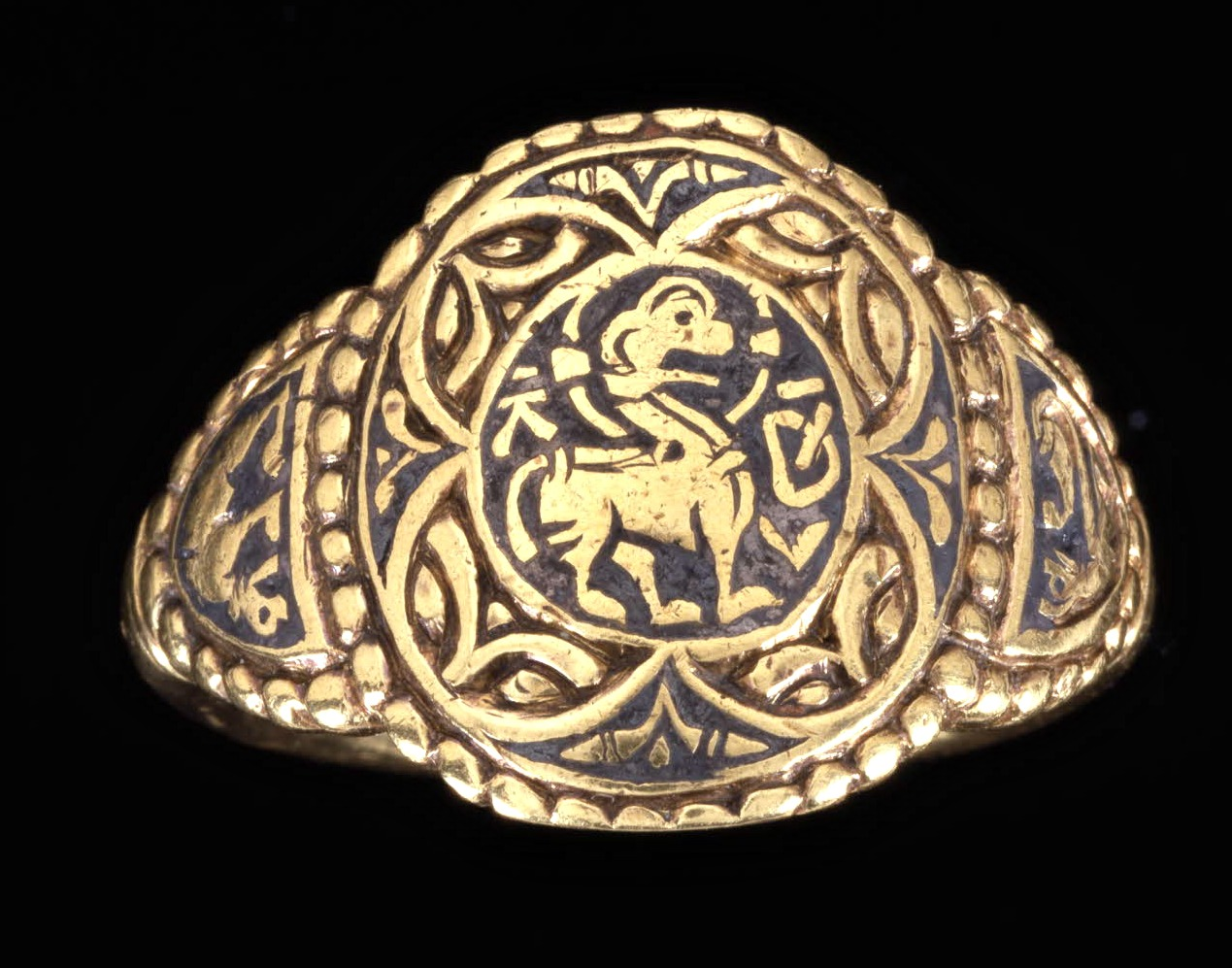
Æthelswith's ring

The Æthelwulf and Æthelswith finger-rings are important examples of Trewhiddle style gold metalwork. The rings belonged to Æthelwulf, King of Wessex and his daughter, Æthelswith (838-888 AD). Æthelwulf was the father of Alfred the Great. His rule spanned the years between 836 and 858 AD. Ethelswith reigned as Queen of Mercia from 853 to 874, when her husband King Burgred of Mercia died. The rings are significant in that they both contain unusual images of Christian iconography: the Lamb of God is featured on Æthelswith's ring and two peacocks drinking at the Fountain of Life are the central image on Æthelwulf's ring.

The Fuller Brooch, an intricately carved silver and niello inlay brooch, is dated to the late 9th century. The circular brooch illustrates the embodiment of the Five Senses. Belonging to the late Trewhiddle style, and featuring Trewhiddle style animals, birds, plants and humans, the Anglo-Saxon brooch is rare for its use of anthropomorphic motifs. It is considered one of the most famous examples of Anglo-Saxon art.

The Strickland Brooch, a mid-ninth century silver and niello inlay disc brooch is similar in design to the Fuller Brooch. Both pieces of jewellery are made from sheet silver and inlaid with niello and gold. The Strickland Brooch's lively open-work design is elaborately carved with collared dog-like beasts and animal heads.

=== Strap-ends ===
Late Anglo-Saxon era strap-ends, accessories used to fasten to the end of a strap or belt to keep it from unraveling, were often decorated in the Trewhiddle style. The eight strap-ends of the Poppleton hoard, discovered near Upper Poppleton, Yorkshire, and dating from the late 9th to early 10th century, are excellent examples of Trewhiddle style metalwork.

Trewhiddle examples

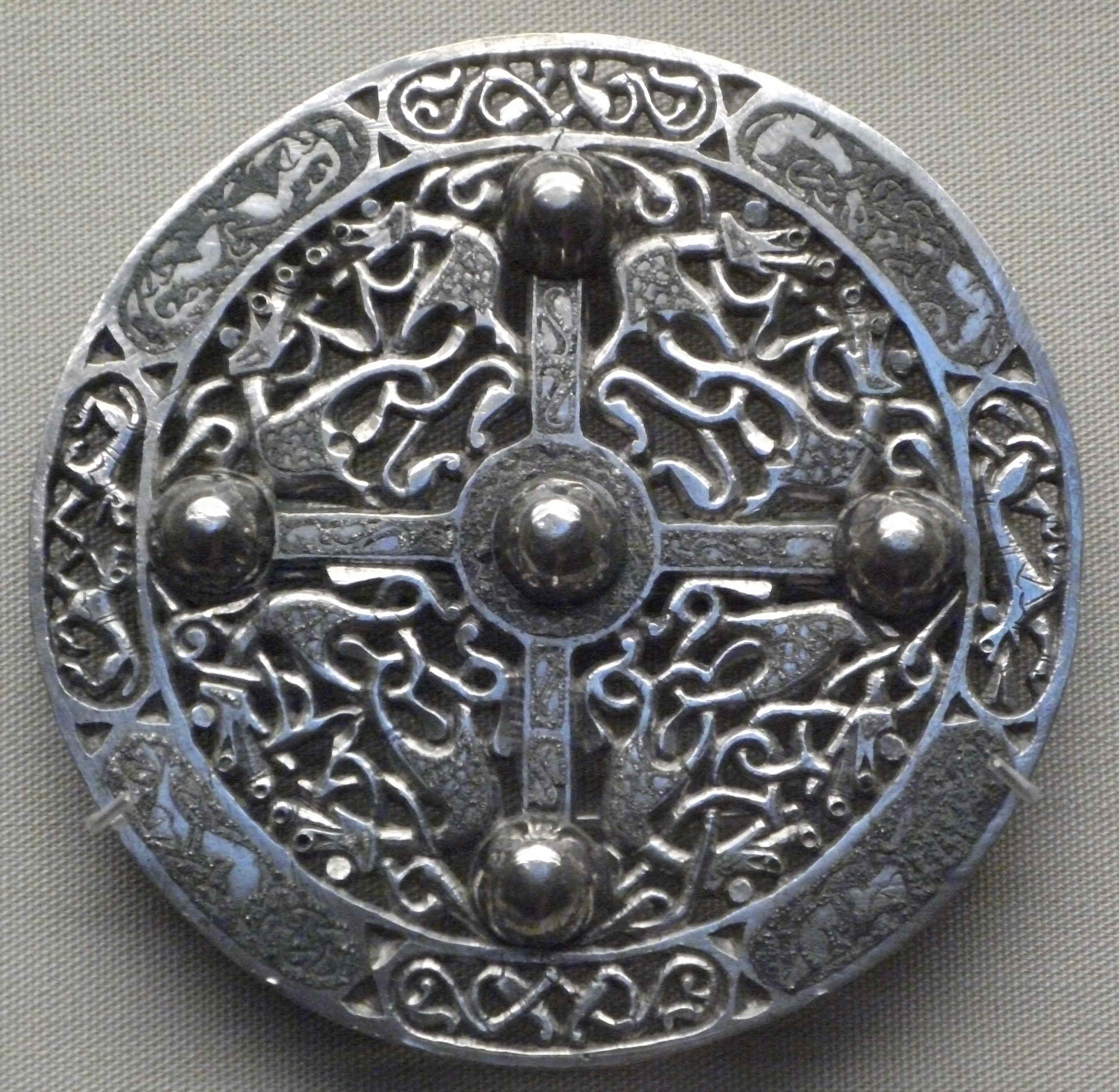
Pentney Hoard brooch

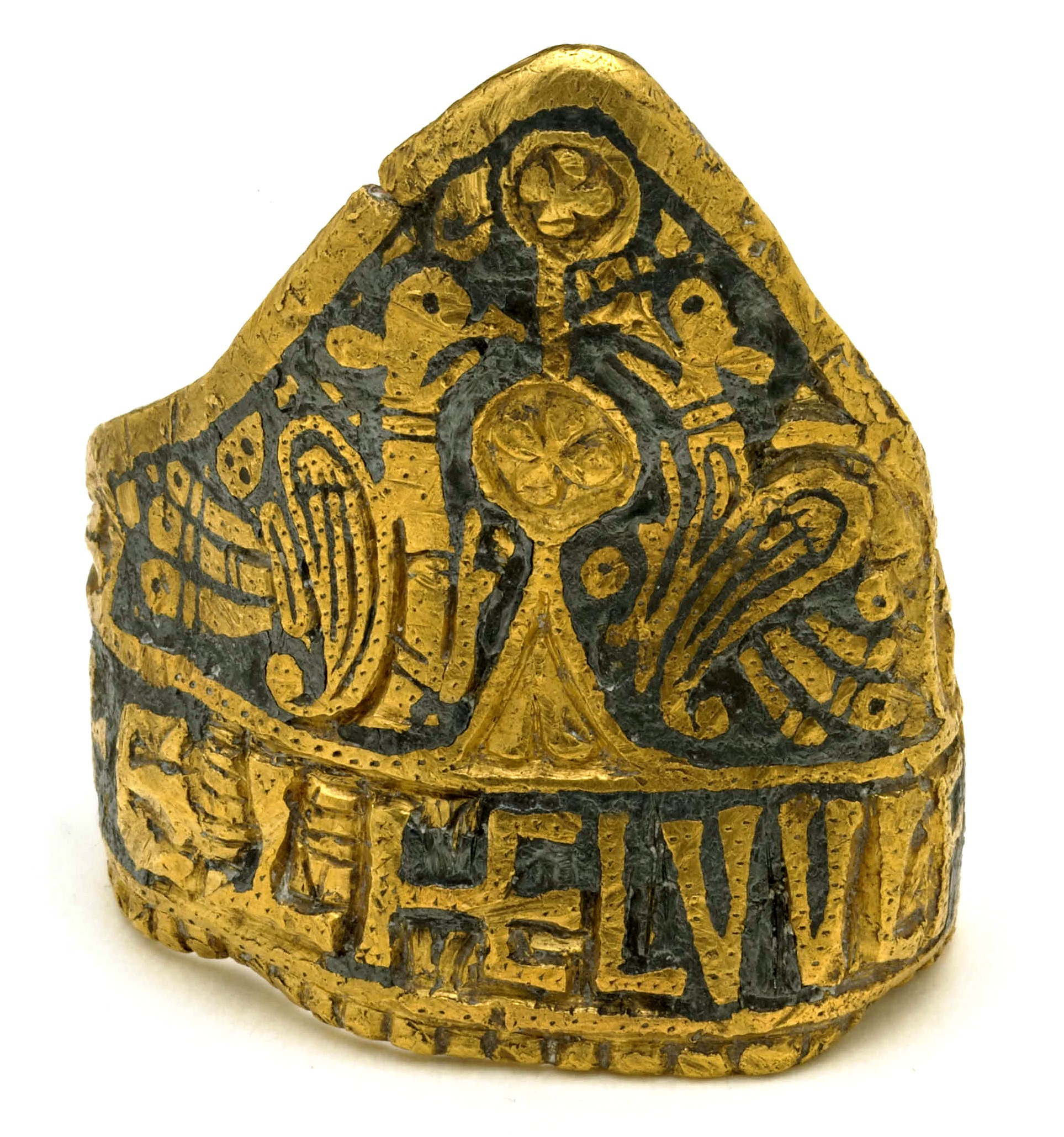
King Æthelwulf ring

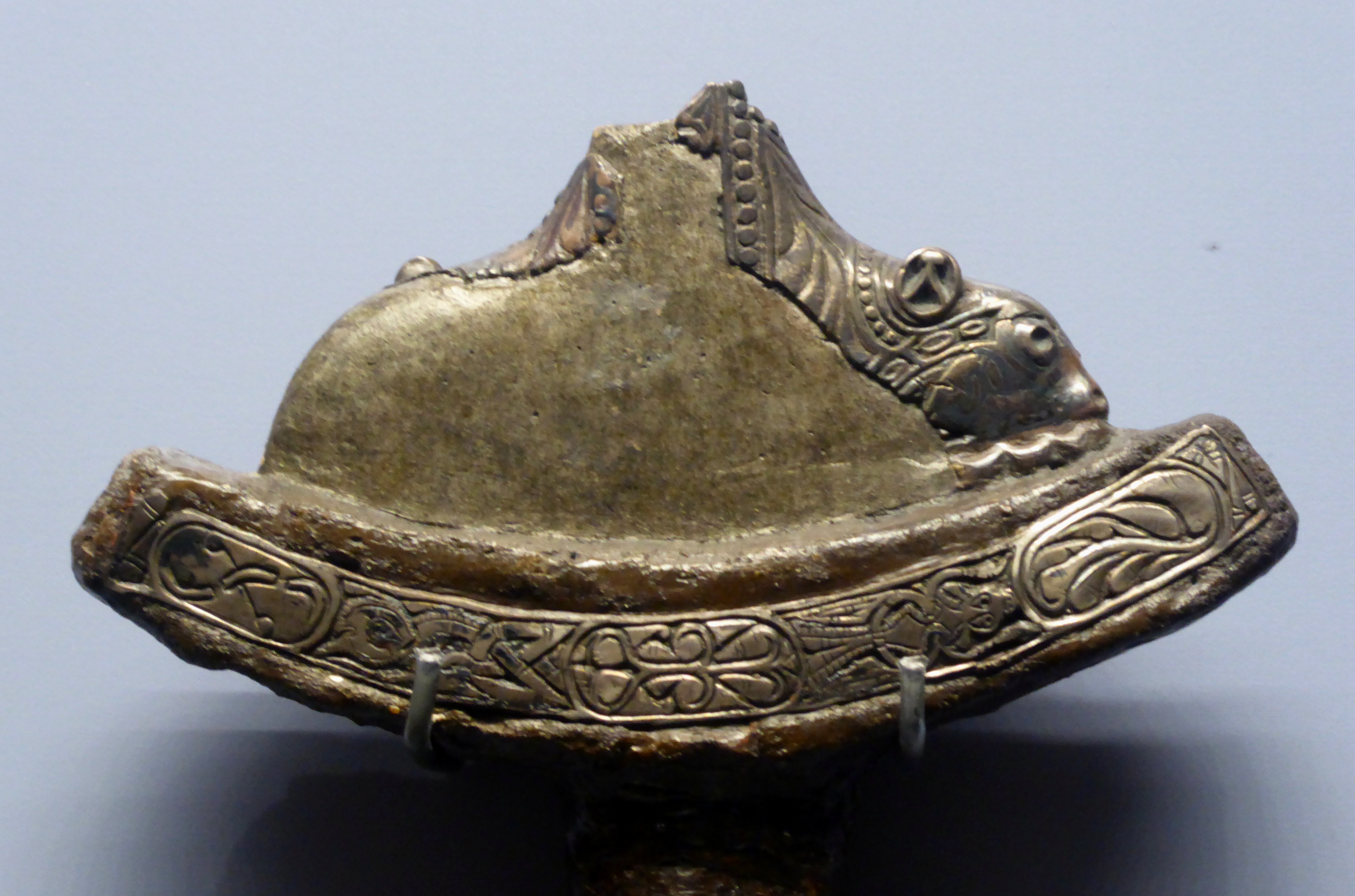
Abingdon Sword pommel

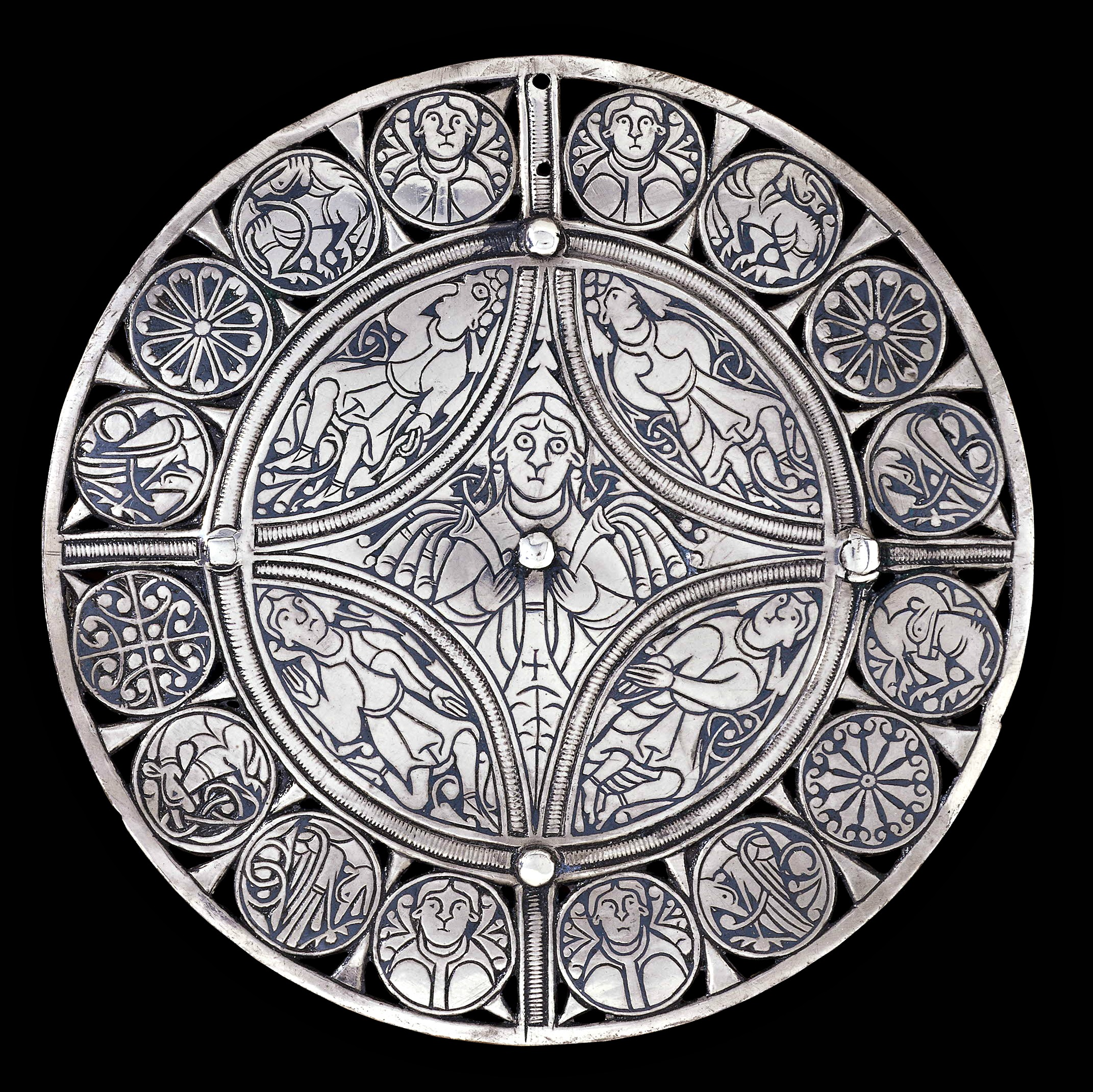
Fuller Brooch

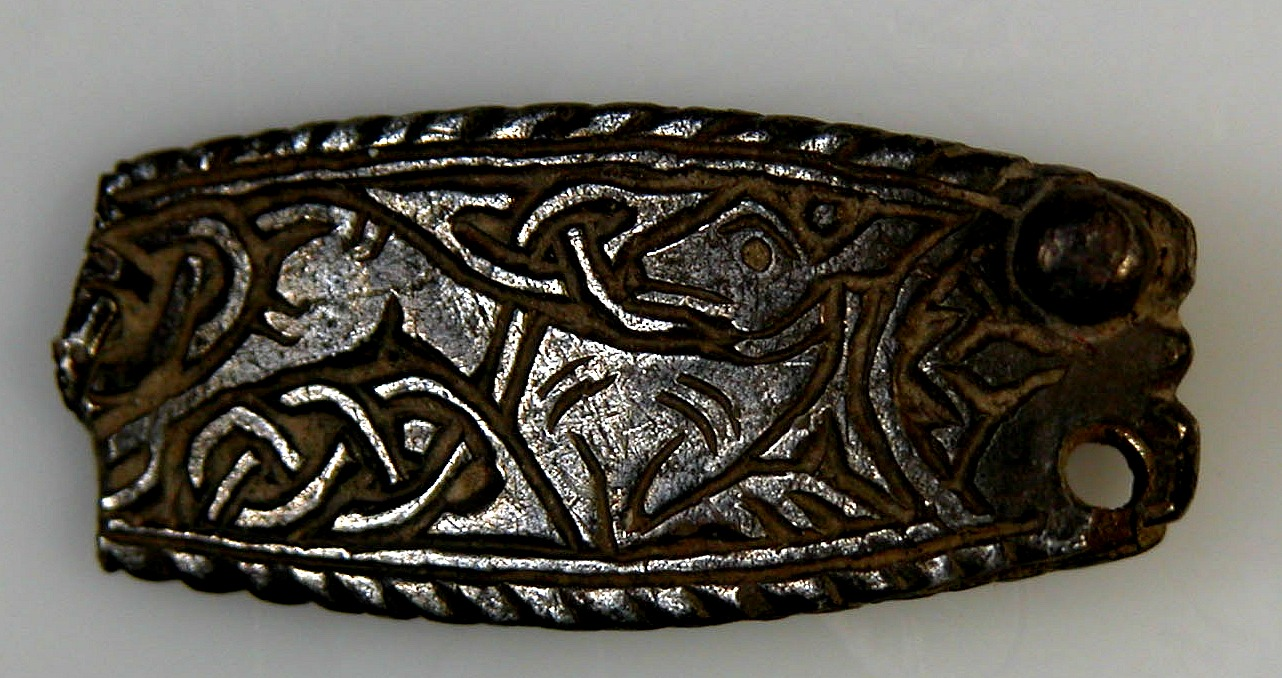
Strap-end

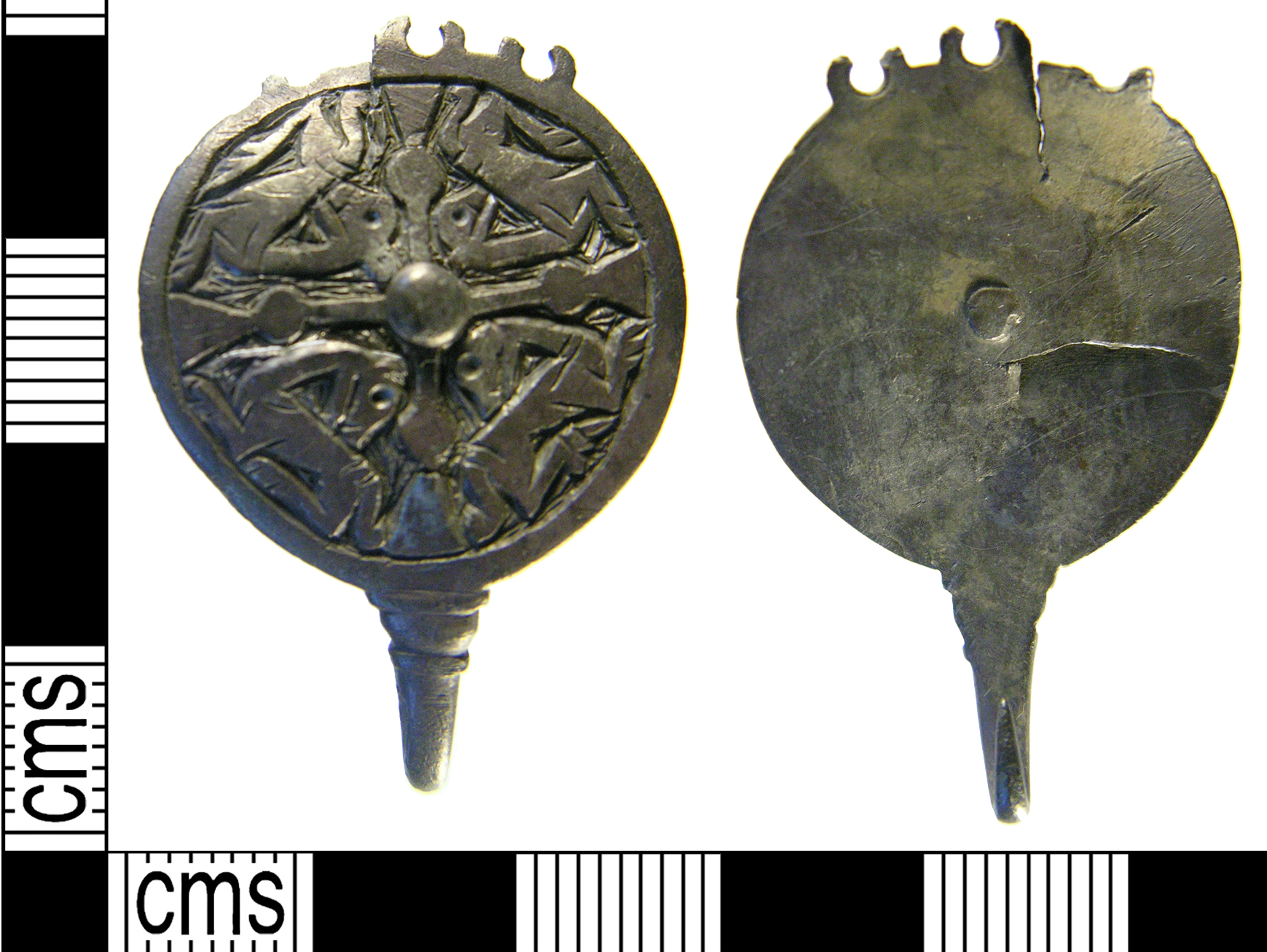
Hooked tag

== See also ==
- Insular art
- Migration period art
- Celtic art
- Viking art
