= Pentney Priory =

Augustinian priory in Pentney, Norfolk, England

Coordinates: 52°40′45″N 0°30′56″E

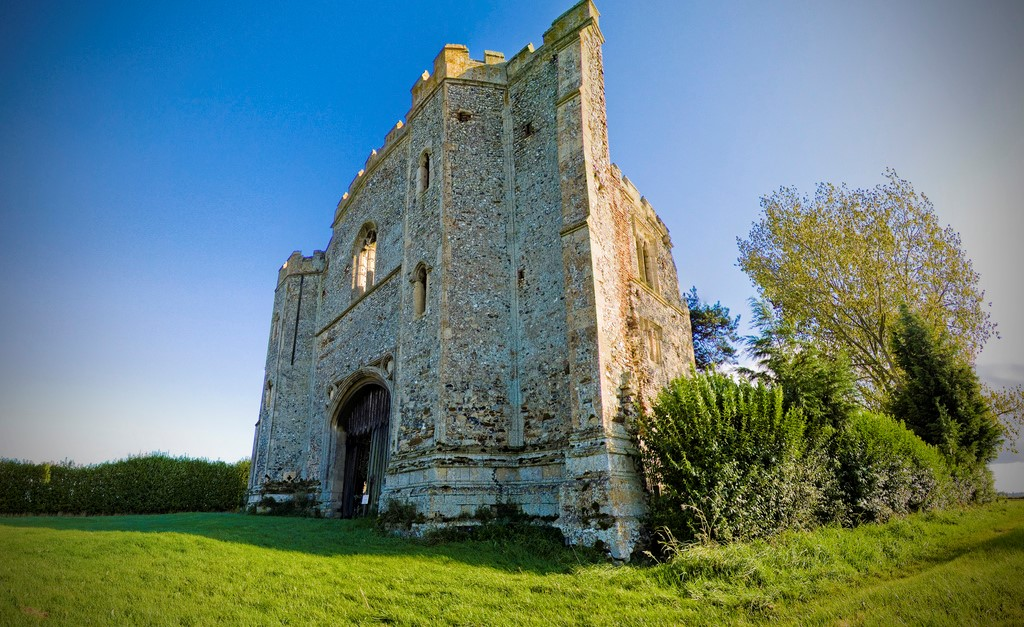
Ruins of Priory gatehouse

Pentney Priory was an Augustinian priory at Pentney in the district of King's Lynn and West Norfolk, Norfolk, England. The ruins of the priory, mostly comprising the flint-built gatehouse, are Grade I listed.

The Priory was founded c.1130 by Robert de Vaux and dedicated to the Holy Trinity, Blessed Virgin Mary and Mary Magdalene. In 1468 Walter Hart, Bishop of Norwich, united Pentney with Wormegay Priory with the consent of both establishments, Wormgay becoming a cell of Pentney. Pentney Priory was finally dissolved in 1537 as part of the Dissolution of the Monasteries under King Henry VIII. Prior Codde, prior at the time, was awarded a pension of £24 and appointed warden of the Hospital of St Giles, Norwich.

The property was granted to Thomas Manners, 1st Earl of Rutland in 1538/9 and ultimately became incorporated into Abbey Farm, which now occupies the site. Stone from the Priory has been used in Abbey Farm and its outbuildings on the site, as well as other buildings in the village of Pentney.

Dita Lee and Howard Barber quickly decided to purchase the property after visiting it in July 2010; they renovated the farmhouse and converted nearby outbuildings into guest accommodation. In 2012 English Heritage granted £200,000 for emergency repairs to the crumbling masonry. In January 2016 the property went back on the market for £1.95 million.

== Burials ==
- Robert I de Vaux of Pentney
- Robert II de Vaux of Pentney
- Maud de Vaux, wife of William Ros, 1st Baron Ros
- Petronilla de Nerford
