= Pentney =

Village in Norfolk, England

Coordinates: 52.694562°N 0.543727°E

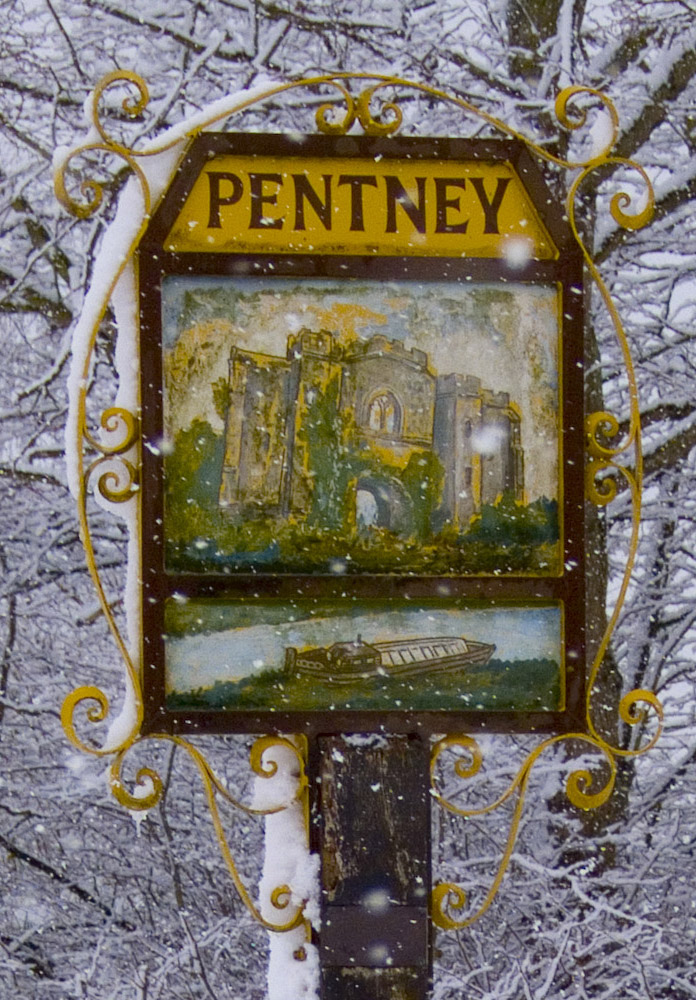
- Pentney village sign in the midst of a rare springtime snowfall during 2008

- Location within Norfolk
- Area: 10.39 km^{2} (4.01 sq mi)
- Population: 544 (2011)
  - Density: 52/km^{2} (130/sq mi)
- OS grid reference: TF720138
- Shire county: Norfolk
- Region: East
- Country: England
- Sovereign state: United Kingdom
- Post town: KING'S LYNN
- Postcode district: PE32
- Dialling code: 01760
- Police: Norfolk
- Fire: Norfolk
- Ambulance: East of England

Pentney is a village and civil parish in the English county of Norfolk, located about 8 miles (13 km) south east of King's Lynn, placing it about halfway between King's Lynn and Swaffham on the A47 road. It covers an area of 10.39 km^{2} (4.01 sq mi) and had a population of 387 in 184 households at the 2001 census, increasing to 544 at the 2011 Census. For the purposes of local government, it falls within the district of King's Lynn and West Norfolk. It is in the valley of the River Nar, a tributary of the River Great Ouse.

The age of the village is unknown, but it dates at least to the 3rd or 4th centuries AD, from which time there is evidence of a Romano-British local pottery industry. A Roman road and settlement in Pentney ran close to the river Nar. The name suggests that Pentney was at one time an island: one theory for the etymology is Penta's / Penda's Island, from the Anglo-Saxon Pendan-ig, the ig being equivalent to Old Norse ey = island (Pentney is on drained waterlands).

== History ==
=== Augustinian Priory ===
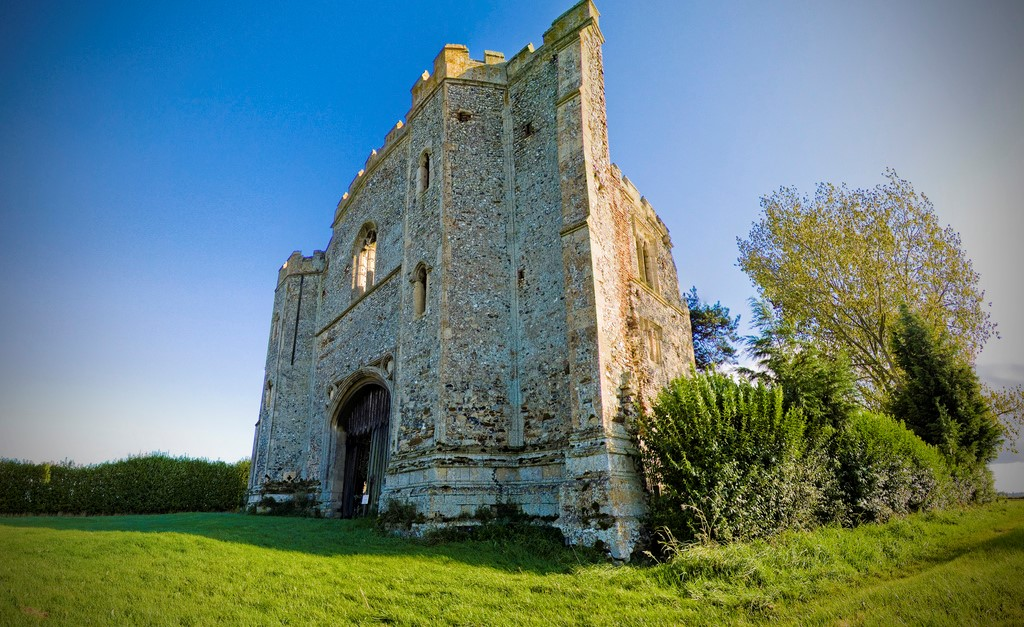
The remains of the gatehouse at the old Augustinian Priory in Pentney

About a mile west of the village, on the north bank of the River Nar, is the gatehouse, all that remains of the Augustinian Pentney Priory, also known as Priory of the Holy Trinity, St Mary and St Magdalene, established around 1130. It was founded by Robert de Vaux, one of the Norman nobles who came to England with William I. on lands that had belonged to Hacon the Dane, evicted by William. De Vaux installed a number of Augustine Canons to come and settle at Pentney to pray for the souls of him and his family. It soon established itself, and continued for centuries, as a significant and prosperous presence in Pentney for its farming and teaching activities.

The gatehouse itself – "the finest in Norfolk and a smaller copy of that at Thornton Abbey" – dates from the 14th century and is a three-storey multi-unit lodging built of flint rubble with Barnack stone dressing.

A number of members of aristocratic families are known to have been buried at the Priory: Maud, wife of William de Ros; Petronilla de Nerford (died 1326) and John de Nerford (died 1328).

Pentney Priory became the centre of a religious and political controversy in the 1160s when Hugh Bigod, 1st Earl of Norfolk, took the opportunity during the anarchic reign of King Stephen to seize its considerable lands, claiming the right under a weakness in the details of a property agreement between his father and Roger de Vaux. Geoffrey, the Prior of Pentney, took the case to the Pope, and when it finally was dealt with, in the reign of Henry II, Bigod was excommunicated by the Pope, who imposed an interdict on the earldom. This created a tension between Henry, who opposed the interdict, and the Bishops of London and Norwich, who with the support of Thomas Becket were expected to enforce it.

In 1280, Archbishop John Peckham conducted a stringent visitation of the Priory as part of a crackdown on misconduct at religious institutions in the Norwich diocese. Pentney and its Canons were found without fault.

The Priory went in decline in the 15th century and consolidated with Wormegay priory in 1468. Pentney Priory was finally closed during the Dissolution of the Monasteries under Henry VIII, who had the Priory shut down in February 1537, and its estate and properties sold to Thomas Manners, the Earl of Rutland.

Stone from the Priory has been used in Abbey Farm and Little Abbey Farm. Many of the houses and outbuildings in Pentney also contain Barnack stone taken from the Abbey.

=== Wayside Cross ===
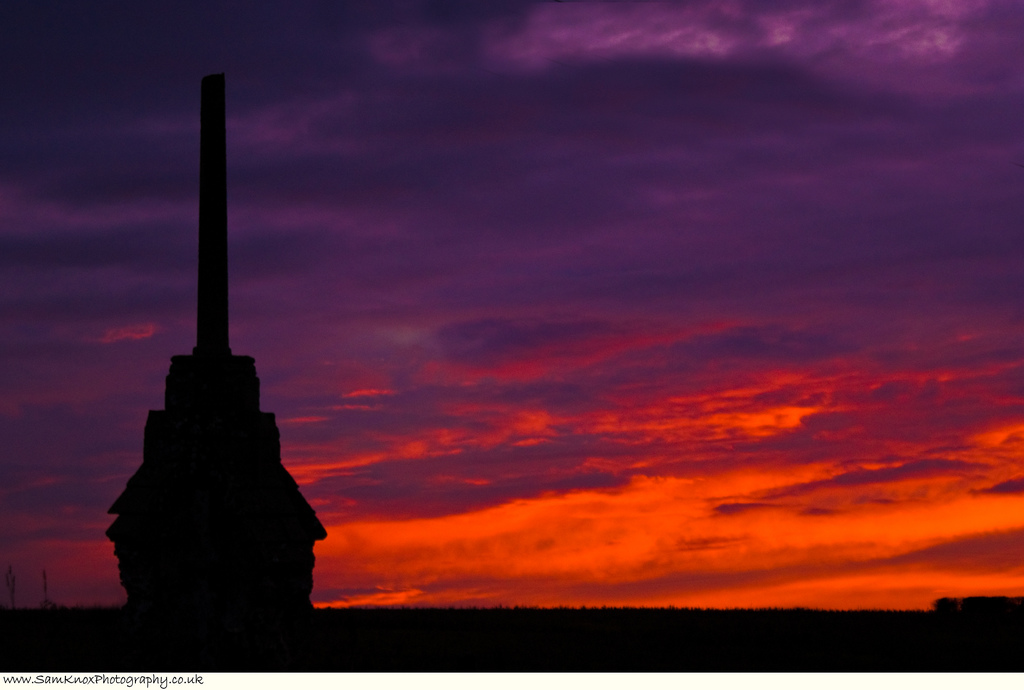
The wayside cross that marked the route between the church of St Mary Magdalene in the village to the old Augustinian Priory

Between the village and the Priory are the remains of a wayside cross; the cross having been broken off in historical times, only the plinth and pillar remain. A correspondent to Notes and Queries wrote of it: "We find the pedestal and shaft of what must have been, when perfect, a most handsome cross, it all seems in such perfect proportion. The shaft is remarkably slender, even for a wayside cross".

=== Pentney Church ===
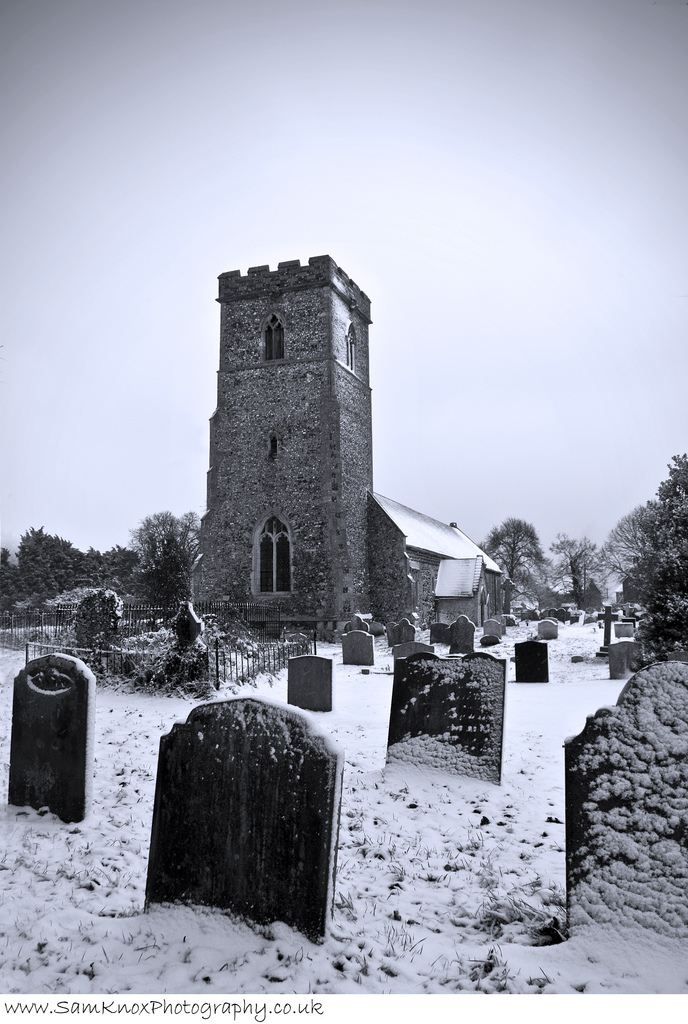
The church of St Mary Magdalene in Pentney

The church of St Mary Magdalene has stood on this site since Norman times and was originally built as a small chapel with an apse. It was doubled in length in the 13th or 14th century.

=== Pentney Treasure ===
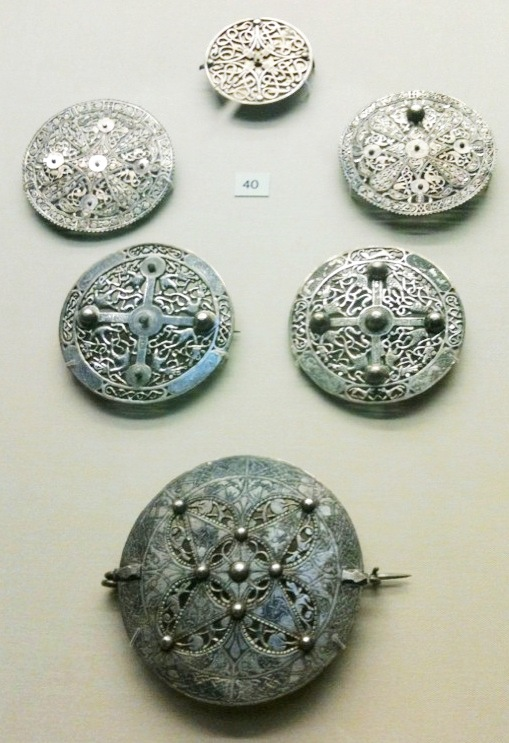
The Pentney Hoard on display at the British Museum

In 1978, an East Dereham gravedigger, William King, found six silver Saxon brooches while digging a grave at the church. Not realising what they were, he handed them to the rector, who locked them in the vestry chest. Three years later the new rector, the Rev. John Wilson, recognised their significance, and they were subsequently identified by the British Museum as 9th century silver disc brooches of national importance, made of delicately cut and engraved sheet silver.

An inquest declared the items as treasure trove and the property of the Crown. Mr King was given the value of the brooches, £135,000. He donated £25,000 to Pentney church, and the brooches can now be viewed at the British Museum.

== Transport ==
Pentney was formerly served by the Narborough and Pentney railway station on the Lynn and Dereham Railway. The line was opened in 1846–8 and closed in September 1968 as part of the Beeching Axe. Currently, the only remaining public transport links to the village are an infrequent bus service which operates in the morning only.

The River Nar is not navigable but was temporarily made so in the 1750s. Authorised by an Act of 1751, the river was opened for barge traffic, with ten staunches constructed, from King's Lynn to Narborough, a little east of Pentney. River traffic ceased in 1884.

=== Pentney Poacher ===
Pentney was the birthplace of the well-known 'King of the Norfolk Poachers'. The Pentney Poacher's story is told in the East Anglian classic I Walked by Night. More recently a short documentary follows the story and identity of the poacher, said to be Fred Rolfe who ended his life by suicide in Bungay, Suffolk.

== Governance ==
Pentney is a parish of the Kings Lynn and West Norfolk district council, which is responsible for the most local services. Norfolk County Council is responsible for roads, some schools and social services. For Westminster elections the parish forms part of the North West Norfolk constituency, represented by James Wild (Conservative).
