= Robert II de Vaux of Gilisland =

English noble

Robert II de Vaux
- Baron of Gilsland
- Vaux of Gilsland arms: Chequy or and gules.
- Died: 1235
- Noble family: de Vaux

Robert II de Vaux (died 1235) Baron of Gilsland, was an English noble.

He was the eldest son of Ranulf de Vaux and Alicia. Robert succeeded his father when he died in 1199. He married Johanna, of unknown parentage. Robert provided his mother, sister and his half brother Roland, as hostages for his debts with King John of England in 1212. He was made governor of the castle of Carlisle by John in 1215, and later joined the barons who took up arms against John. Robert was required to pay scutage for not attending a number of military campaigns of King Henry III of England. He died in 1235 and was succeeded by his son Hubert.
