= Hubert II de Vaux =

English nobleman

- Baron of Gilsland
- Vaux of Gilsland arms: Chequy or and gules.
- Died: 1240
- Noble family: de Vaux

Hubert II de Vaux (died 1240) Baron of Gilsland, was an English noble.

He was the eldest son of Robert de Vaux and Johanna. He succeeded his father in 1235. He married Aline, of unknown parentage. He died in 1240. His wife Aline was later married to Geoffrey de Say of Rickling. Hubert’s only daughter and heir Maud was married to Thomas de Multon.
