= Hubert I de Vaux =

12th-century English noble

Hubert de Vaux
- Baron of Gilsland
- Died: c. 1164
- Noble family: de Vaux

Hubert de Vaux, also known as Hubert de Vallibus, was a prominent 12th-century English noble.

== Biography ==
Hubert was a tenant in chief of Baldwin de Redvers, holding land at Farwood Barton in Devonshire. When Baldwin rebelled against King Stephen of England, during the Anarchy, Baldwin was banished to Anjou, where Baldwin entered the services of Empress Matilda. Hubert most likely lost his Devonshire lands and followed his overlord into the service of Matilda, where Hubert was a witness to a number of charters of Matilda in France. He was with Henry FitzEmpress in 1149, when Henry stayed at Devizes, while travelling to be knighted by his uncle King David I of Scotland. He obtained lands and the lordship of Gilsland on the border of Northumberland and Cumbria, as well as Corby and Catterlen in Cumbria. Hubert received the Barony of Gilsland from King Henry II of England, for Hubert's services for Henry II in France, against King Stephen of England and in the 1157 campaign to recover Cumberland from the Scots. Gilsland had been attempted to be granted by Ranulph de Meschines to his brother William, but William was unable to dislodge the native lord, the eponymous Gille, son of Bueth. Gille is known to have died and Henry II, then gifted Gilsland to Hubert in 1158. Hubert is said to have started construction of castles at Naworth and Corby. He held the lands of Gilsland by the service of two knights to the King. He witnessed a charter by Henry II at Rouen, Normandy in early 1149. Hubert is known to have been dead in 1165, as a confirmation of Gilsland was given to his son Robert in 1165 by Henry II.

== Marriage and issue ==
He married Grecia, of unknown parentage; they had the following issue:

- Robert de Vaux, Lord of Gilsland (died c.1195) married Ada, widow of Simon de Morville, the daughter and heiress of William de Engaine, died without surviving issue.
- Ranulf de Vaux, Lord of Triermain and Torcrossock (died 1199), married Alicia, succeeded his brother, had issue.
- Eustace de Vaux, Lord of Castle Carrock and Hayton, married Alice, the sister and co-heiress of Robert, son of Bueth.
- Beatrix de Vaux, married William Briwerre, Lord of Tor Brewer, had issue. Beatrix had been the mistress of Reginald de Dunstanville, 1st Earl of Cornwall (died 1175) and was the mother of Henry FitzCount (died 1221) and William FitzCount.
