= Wormegay Priory =

Priory in Norfolk, England

Wormegay Priory was a priory in Norfolk, England.

It was founded by William de Warenne, a royal justice.

In 1468 Walter Hart, Bishop of Norwich, united Wormegay with Pentney Priory with the consent of both establishments, Wormgay becoming a cell of Pentney.
