= Francis Polkinghorne Pascoe =

English entomologist (1813–1893)

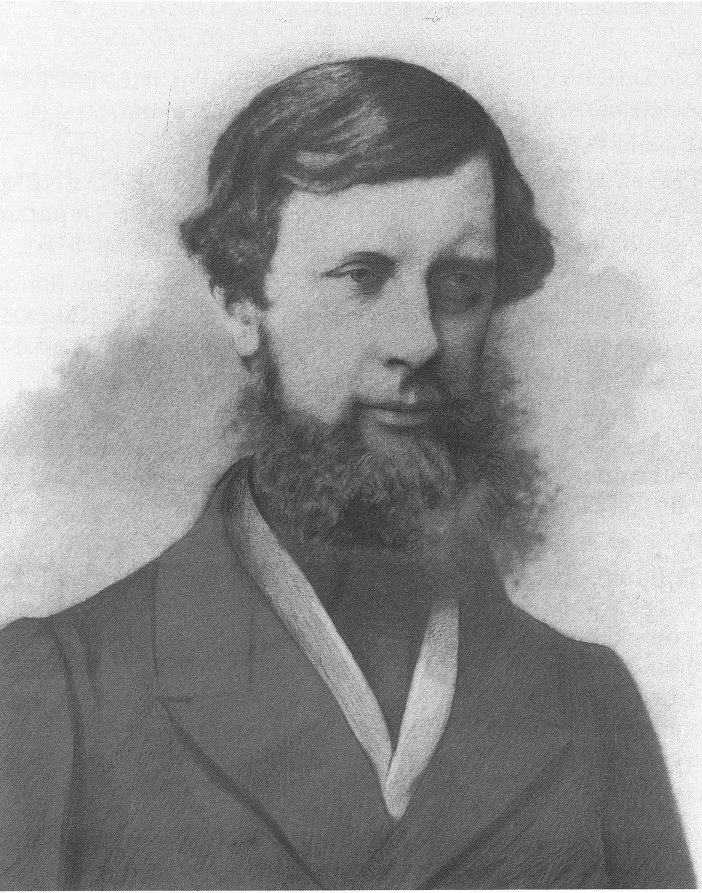
Francis Polkinghorne Pascoe

Francis Polkinghorne Pascoe (1 September 1813 – 20 June 1893) was an English entomologist mainly interested in beetles.

== Biography ==
He was born in Penzance, Cornwall and trained at St. Bartholomew's Hospital, London. Appointed surgeon in the Navy he served on Australian, West Indian and Mediterranean stations. He married a Miss Mary Glasson of Cornwall and settled at Trewhiddle near St Austell where his wife's property produced china clay. Widowed in 1851 he settled in London devoting himself to natural history and entomology in particular. The results of collecting trips to Europe, North Africa and the Lower Amazons were poor and Pascoe worked mainly on insects collected by others. His entomological papers listed and described species collected by Alfred Russel Wallace (in Longicornia Malayana), Robert Templeton and other assiduous collectors but not prolific writers on systematic entomology. He became a Fellow of the Entomological Society in 1854, was president from 1864 to 1865, a Member of the Société Entomologique de France and belonged to the Belgian and Stettin Societies. He was also a Fellow of the Linnean Society (elected 1852) and was on the Council of the Ray Society. His 2,500 types are in the Natural History Museum, London.

== Evolution ==
Pascoe accepted the fact of evolution but was an opponent to natural selection. Pascoe's 1890 book The Darwinian Theory of the Origin of Species was an attack on natural selection. It received a lengthy review in the Nature journal by Raphael Meldola who disagreed with Pascoe's criticisms but noted the work should be taken seriously as Pascoe was a respected systematic entomologist.

== Works ==
- 1858 On new genera and species of longicorn Coleoptera. Part III Trans. Entomol. Soc. London, (2)4:236–266.
- 1859 On some new genera and species of longicorn Coleoptera. Part IV.Trans.Entomol. Soc. London, (2)5:12–61.
- 1860 Notices of new or little-known genera and species of Coleoptera. J.Entomol., 1(1):36–64.
- 1860 Notices of new or little-known genera and species of Coleoptera, pt.II. J. Entomol., 1(2):98–131.
- 1862 Notices of new or little-known genera and species of Coleoptera. J.Entomol., 1:319–370.
- 1864–1869 Longicornia Malayana; or a descriptive catalogue of the species of the three longicorn families Lamiidae, Cerambycidae and Prionidae collected by Mr. A. R. Wallace in the Malay Archipelago. Trans. Entomol. Soc. London, (3)3:1-712.
- 1866 List of the Longicornia collected by the late Mr. P. Bouchard, at Santa Marta. Trans. Entomol. Soc. London, 5(3):279–296.
- 1867 Diagnostic characters of some new genera and species of Prionidae.Ann. Mag. Nat. Hist., (3)19:410–413
- 1875 Notes on Coleoptera, with descriptions of new genera and species. Part III. Ann. Mag. Nat. Hist., (4)15:59–73.
- 1884 Notes on Natural Selection and the Origin of Species. Taylor & Francis.
- 1885 List of British Vertebrate Animals. Taylor & Francis.
- 1890 The Darwinian Theory of the Origin of Species. Gurney & Jackson.

== Other sources ==
- Lee, Sidney, ed. (1895). "Pascoe, Francis Polkinghorne" . Dictionary of National Biography. Vol. 43. London: Smith, Elder & Co.
- Obituary in Natural science: a monthly review of scientific progress. Volume 3, 1893: S. 159
- A. Boucard Obituary in The Humming Bird. A Quarterly, Artistic and Industrial Review. Volume 5. Spring Vale, 1895: S. 12–13
