= Thomas II de Multon =

13th century English noble

- Baron of Burgh and Gilsland
- Died: 1271

Thomas II de Multon, Moulton, or Muleton (died 1271), Baron of Burgh and Gilsland, was an English noble.

He was the eldest son of Thomas de Multon and Ada de Morville. He succeeded his father in 1240. He died in 1271 and was succeeded by his grandson Thomas, father of Thomas, 1st Baron Multon.

== Marriage and issue ==
Thomas married Maud, daughter and sole heiress of Hubert de Vaux and Aline. They are known to have had the following known issue:

- Thomas de Multon, married Isabella, had issue.
- Hubert de Multon, married firstly Ada la Brune, had issue and secondly Margaret du Bois, also with issue.
- James de Multon, had issue.
- Aline de Multon, married William de Braose, 1st Baron Braose, had issue.
