= Ranulph =

Given name

Ranulph is a masculine given name of Norman origin.

Ranulph is a composite name, from "Ran-," which comes from the Old Norse "rann" ("house") or Germanic "ragn" ("advice" or "power"), with "-ulf," from the Old Norse word "úlfr" ("wolf"), cognate with Danish "ulv," Icelandic "úlfur," Swedish "ulv," Norwegian "ulv," and Faroese "úlvur."

Notable people with the name Ranulph include:

- Ranulph (Archdeacon of Leicester) (fl. 1092)
- Ranulph Bacon QPM (1906–1988), British police officer
- Ranulph Brito or Le Breton (died 1246), canon of St. Paul's
- Ranulph Crewe (1558–1646), English judge and Chief Justice of the King's Bench
- Ranulph Dacre (1797–1884), British master mariner and merchant active in Australia and New Zealand
- Ranulph de Mortimer (bef. 1070 to c. 1104), a Marcher Lord in the Welsh Marches
- Ranulph Drengot (d. 1045), Norman adventurer and mercenary in southern Italy
- Ranulph Fiennes, OBE (born 1944), British explorer, writer and poet, who holds several endurance records
- Ranulph Glanville (1946–2014), Anglo-Irish cybernetician and design theorist
- Ranulph Neville, 1st Baron Neville (1262–1331), English nobleman
- Robert Ranulph Marett (1866–1943), British ethnologist from Jersey
- John Ranulph Vincent, Dean of Bloemfontein, in South Africa, from 1892, and afterwards of Grahamstown, 1912–1914

== See also ==
- Ranulf
- Randolph
- Radulph/Ralph
