= Fuller Brooch =

9th-century Anglo-Saxon brooch

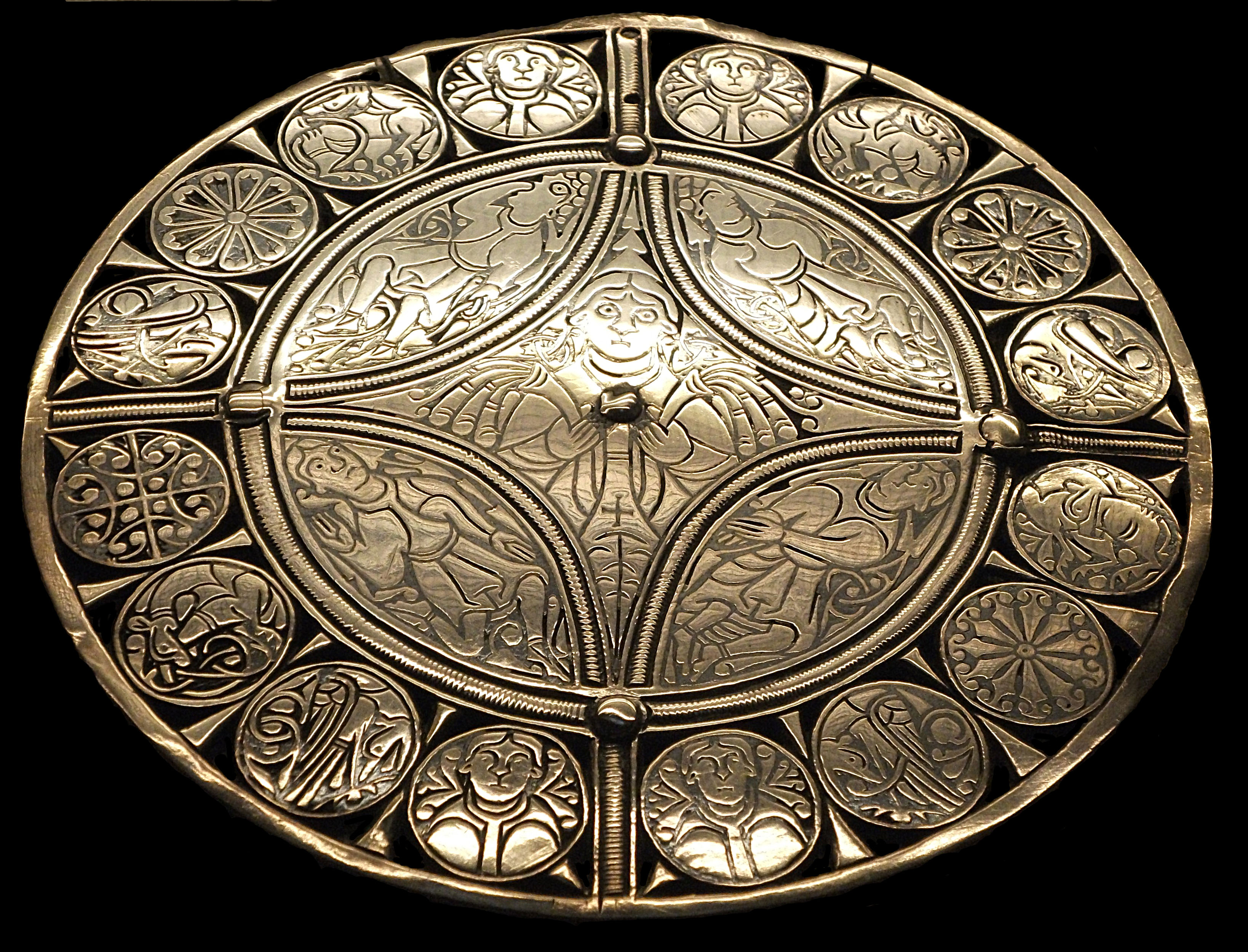
- The Fuller Brooch as displayed in the British Museum
- Material: Silver and niello
- Size: 11.4 cm in diameter
- Created: Late 9th Century AD
- Present location: British Museum, London
- Registration: M&ME 1952,0404.1

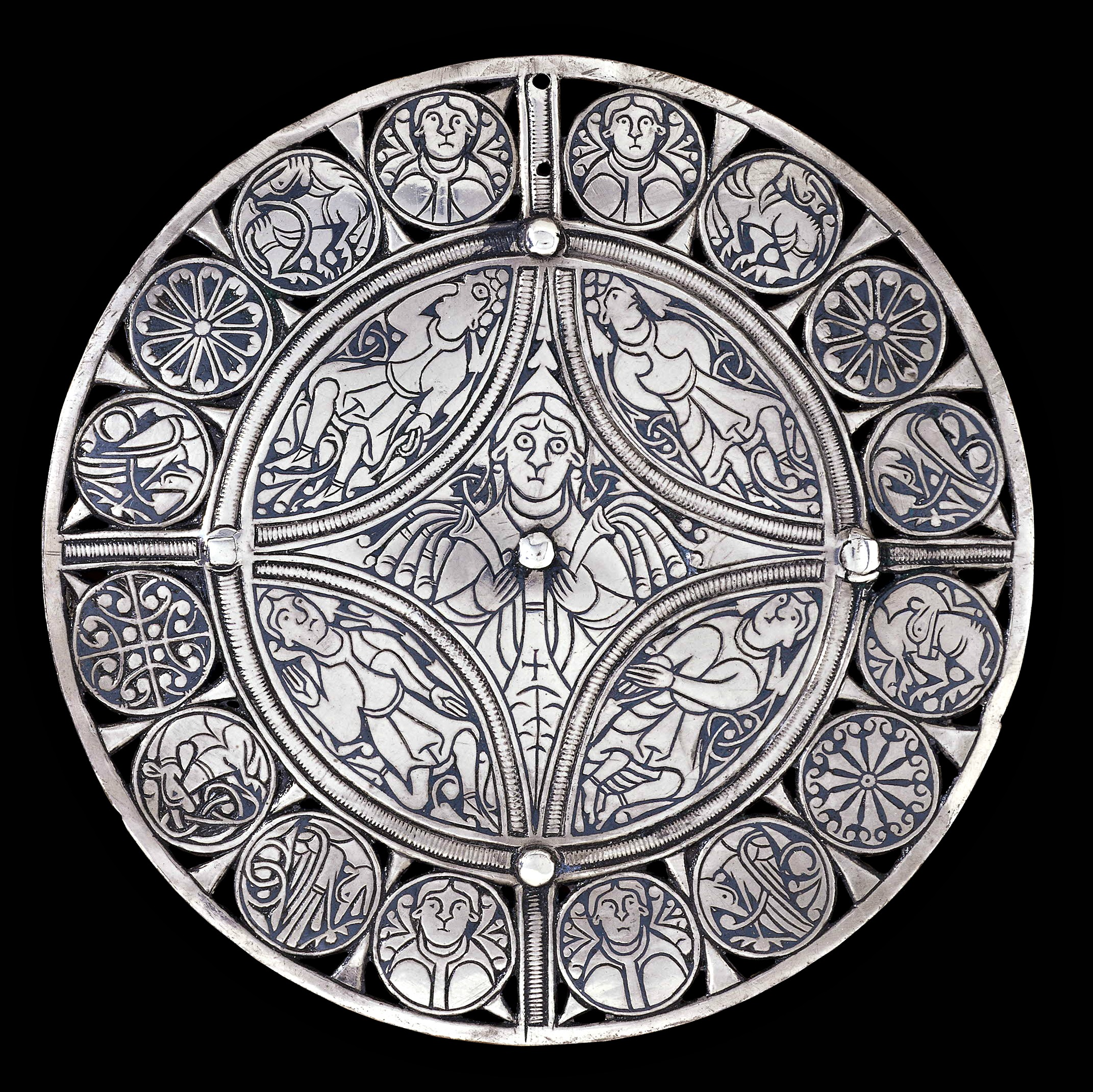
Front view of the brooch

The Fuller Brooch is an Anglo-Saxon silver and niello brooch dated to the late 9th century, which is now in the British Museum, where it is normally on display in Room 41. The elegance of the engraved decoration depicting the Five Senses, highlighted by being filled with niello, makes it one of the most highly regarded pieces of Anglo-Saxon art.

== Description ==
The brooch is a large disc made of hammered sheet silver inlaid with black niello and with a diameter of 114 mm (4.5 in). Its centre roundel is decorated with personifications of the five senses. In the centre is Sight with large staring oval eyes, surrounded by the other four senses, each in his own compartment. Taste is in the upper left, Smell is in the upper right, Touch is in the lower right, and Hearing is in the lower left. Taste has a hand in his mouth. Smell's hands are behind his back, and he stands between two tall plants. Touch rubs his hands together. Hearing holds his hand to his ear. This is the earliest known representation of the five senses. The outer border consists of 16 small medallions decorated with human, bird, animal and plant motifs.

== Style and materials ==
Stylistically it is "in a very late version of the Trewhiddle style". After the discovery of the Strickland Brooch, one of the closest parallels to the Fuller Brooch, also 9th-century and in the British Museum, additional research determined that the niello used in the Fuller Brooch was mainly silver sulphide, a type that went out of use later in the medieval period, in itself an argument against it being a modern forgery. The niello technique may indicate that the brooch was made by metalworkers of Alfred the Great's court.

== History of ownership ==
The brooch has survived in excellent condition, although the pin and its attachments have been removed, and the top of the brooch has been perforated for suspension, and it may be the only surviving piece of secular Anglo-Saxon metalwork to remain unburied since its creation. It was thought to be a fake by Sir Charles Hercules Read, Keeper of British and Medieval Antiquities of the British Museum, because of its excellent condition. He advised the Ashmolean Museum in Oxford which had been lent the brooch, to take it off display. It was then bought by Captain A. W. F. Fuller for the price of the silver. In 1952 Capt. Fuller donated the brooch to the British Museum on the condition that it henceforth be called the Fuller Brooch.
