= Cruel Coppinger =

Cruel Coppinger (Cornish: Coppinger fell) is a semi-legendary figure in Cornish folklore. Coppinger was a real person, but various legends grew up around him, lending him near superhuman powers and a fearsome reputation. He is portrayed as huge and fearsome Dane who after being shipwrecked off Cornwall became the leader of a feared band of smugglers.

== Legend ==
The legend of Cruel Coppinger recognised today, is that recorded by Rev. Robert Stephen Hawker, the composer of the Cornish anthem The Song of the Western Men, who collected the existing legends and, with a few additions of his own, published them in Charles Dickens' magazine All the Year Round in 1866.

His story was prefaced with the verse:
Will you hear of Cruel Coppinger
He came from a foreign kind;
He was brought to us by the salt water,
He was carried away by the wind!

According to the legend, one night, during a great storm, a ship got into trouble near the shore of Cornwall. The local inhabitants turned out to the beach as they often would when there was a chance that a ship would be wrecked and valuable commodities washed up on shore.

On the deck of the ship they saw the lone figure of a huge man, who, leaping into the sea, waded through the surf until he reached the shore. There he grabbed the cloak of an old woman and leapt up on the horse of a young woman who had come down to the shore. Shouting something in a foreign tongue, later held to be the language of the Vikings, he rode off with the girl and made his way to her house where he installed himself, uninvited. He announced himself as Coppinger from Denmark, and little-by-little secured the favour of Dinah Hamlyn, the girl he had carried off.

Eventually he secured her hand in marriage. He mysteriously raised enough money to buy himself a house and lands, and set himself up as the leader of a feared band of smugglers, wreckers and pirates in Cornwall. He controlled a number of bridle paths and footpaths which converged at a steep cliff, at the foot of which was a cave where he kept his booty and stolen livestock.

To discourage surveillance by the Revenue Officers, one of his gang beheaded one of them. Among the ships used by the "Cruel" gang was the Black Prince, a ship built to Coppinger's own design in the shipyards of Denmark, with which he terrorised the English Channel. Using his knowledge of the waters of the Cornish coast he lured a Revenue cutter into the shallow waters of a cove and wrecked her.

When his father-in-law died Coppinger was eager to secure the remainder of his money, and to force his widowed mother-in-law to hand it over, he would threaten to whip his wife with a cat-o-nine-tails.

His son was born a deaf-mute. It was said that because of his father's crime, he was born without a soul. He was known to be mischievous and cruel, and one day was found laughing at the top of cliff, at the bottom of which was the body of a neighbour's child.

Coppinger is said to have disappeared one night when the pressure from the Revenue Officers finally became too much. A lone man saw him put out in small boat to a ship anchored off shore, which raised its sails and disappeared into the night. Coppinger was "carried away with the wind" and never seen again.

== History ==
Little is known of the real Coppinger. Two possible models are John Coppinger who arrived in Cornwall in around 1793 and Daniel Coppinger who was shipwrecked in 1792. It is likely that the Cruel Coppinger of legend is based on an amalgamation of the two.

John Coppinger was of Danish stock, but his family had established itself in Ireland. Reports in his family history suggest he left Cork in about 1760, and moved to Roscoff in Brittany where he had estates. His property in Brittany was destroyed during the French Revolution in 1793 and around this time he moved to Cornwall where he bought an estate named Trewhiddle, near St Austell. It is likely that he supplied contraband from Brittany to Cornwall

Daniel Coppinger is closer to the version of Cruel Coppinger in the legend. Shipwrecked in 1792, he married a woman named Hamlyn, though she was much older than the young girl featured in the legend and was called Ann rather than Dinah. He had property in Hartland and was known to be a "Free Trader" (a pirate or smuggler). He claimed to be a former Navy surgeon; a Coppinger did serve in the Royal Navy as a surgeon around that time, but whether these two were the same person is unknown.
