= Robert II de Vaux of Pentney =

Prominent 12th-century noble

Robert II de Vaux
- Died: c.1150
- Noble family: de Vaux

Robert II de Vaux of Pentney also known as Robert de Vallibus, Lord of Pentney, was a prominent 12th-century noble. He succeeded to the lands in Norfolk, Suffolk and Essex in England, held by his father Robert which had been received from Roger Bigod after the Norman conquest of England. (Note: Lands held by his father, as shown in the 1086 Domesday survey: Belchamp [Otten, St Paul and Walter] and [Great and Little] Henny in Essex, Beechamwell, Heckingham, Fritton, [Morning] Thorpe, Stratton [St Mary and St Michael], Tharston, Shimpling, [East] Walton, East Winch, Flitcham, [Gayton] Thorpe, Grimston, Pentney, Alpington, Colney, Ashby [St Mary], Carleton [St Peter], Claxton, Mundham and Thurton in Norfolk and Bulcamp, Chediston, Cookley, Darsham, Dunwich, Halesworth, Thorpe, Blundeston, Barsham, Ellough, Weston and Worlingham in Suffolk.) Robert was the founder of the Augustinian Pentney Priory, dedicated to the Holy Trinity, St Mary and St Magdalene, which he established c.1130, for the souls of Agnes his wife and their children. He was succeeded by his eldest son William.

== Marriage and issue ==
He married Agnes, daughter of Ranulf Fitz Walter and Matilda de Lanquetot, they are known to have had the following issue:

- William de Vaux
- Oliver de Vaux
- Henry de Vaux
