= Aitard de Vaux =

11th-century European noble

- Noble family: de Vaux

Aitard de Vaux, also known as Aitard de Vals, was an 11th-century noble. A Norman knight, Aitard participated in William, Duke of Normandy's invasion of England in 1066, with his brother Robert. He held lands in Norfolk and Suffolk in England from Roger Bigod, as a tenant in chief. (Note: Lands held as shown in the 1086 Domesday survey: South Raynham, Bramerton, Holverston, Poringland, Rockland [St Mary], Shotesham [All Saints and St Mary], Surlingham, Whitlingham, Yelverton, Hethel and Keswick in Norfolk and Denham, in Suffolk.) He was succeeded by his son Robert.
