= Ranulf de Vaux of Gilsland =

12th-century English noble

Ranulf de Vaux
- Died: 1199
- Noble family: de Vaux

Ranulf de Vaux, also known as Randolph or Ranulf de Vallibus, (died 1199) Lord of Triermain and later Lord of Gilsland, was a prominent 12th-century English noble.

== Biography ==
Vaux was the second son of Hubert I de Vaux, Lord of Gilsland and his wife Grecia. Ranulf succeeded his elder brother Robert in 1195, with his brother dying without surviving issue. He confirmed the foundation of the Augustinian Lanercost Priory and grants made by his brother Robert. He died in 1199 and was succeeded by his son Robert.

== Marriage and issue ==
He married Alicia, of unknown parentage, they had the following issue:

- Robert de Vaux married Johanna, had issue.
- Grecia de Vaux

He also fathered an illegitimate child Roland de Vaux of Triermain and Torcrossock.
