= River Witham sword =

Two swords in the British Museum

There are two notable swords known recovered from the River Witham, both kept in the British Museum.

The River Witham "Viking sword" (actually a blade of German/Ottonian manufacture, with hilt fittings added by an Anglo-Saxon craftsman), also known as the "Lincoln sword", British Museum 1848,10-21,1 is dated to the 10th century. It is classified as a Petersen type L variant (Evison's "Wallingford Bridge" type). It was found in the River Witham opposite Monks Abbey, Lincoln. The guard is inlaid with silver and copper alloy, in a series of lozenges, each lozenge of copper surrounded by a bronze border and hammered on to a cross-hatched, prepared field. The sword is remarkable for being one of only two known bearing the blade inscription Leutfrit (+ LEUTLRIT), the other being a find from Tatarstan (at the time Volga Bulgaria, now kept in the Historical Museum of Kazan). On the reverse side, the blade is inlaid with a double scroll pattern. The sword weighs 1.214 kg (2.68 lb), at a total length of 91.5 cm (36.0 in). Peirce (1990) makes special mention of this sword as "breath-taking", "one of the most splendid Viking swords extant".

The River Witham knightly sword, BM PE 1858,1116.5 was found in 1825 in the River Witham near Lincoln. is dated to the later 13th century. It is likely of German origin The blade bears an inlaid inscription reading +NDXOXCHWDRGHDXORVI+ The weapon's length is960 or 964 mm (37.8 or 38.0 in) in length. The hilt of the weapon measures 165 mm (6.5 in). The blade itself is 815 mm (32.1 in) in length.

== See also ==
- Medieval sword
- Witham Shield
