= Robert I de Vaux of Pentney =

11th-century Norman noble

Robert I de Vaux
- Noble family: de Vaux

Robert I de Vaux, also known as Robert de Vallibus, Lord of Pentney, was a prominent 11th-century noble. A Norman knight, Robert participated in William, Duke of Normandy's invasion of England in 1066, with his brother Aitard. He obtained lands of Norfolk, Suffolk and Essex in England from Roger Bigod as tenant in chief. (Note: Lands held as shown in the 1086 Domesday survey: Belchamp [Otten, St Paul and Walter] and [Great and Little] Henny in Essex, Beechamwell, Heckingham, Fritton, [Morning] Thorpe, Stratton [St Mary and St Michael], Tharston, Shimpling, [East] Walton, East Winch, Flitcham, [Gayton] Thorpe, Grimston, Pentney, Alpington, Colney, Ashby [St Mary], Carleton [St Peter], Claxton, Mundham and Thurton in Norfolk and Bulcamp, Chediston, Cookley, Darsham, Dunwich, Halesworth, Thorpe, Blundeston, Barsham, Ellough, Weston and Worlingham in Suffolk.) Robert was succeeded by his son Robert.
