= Strickland Brooch =

9th-century Anglo-Saxon brooch

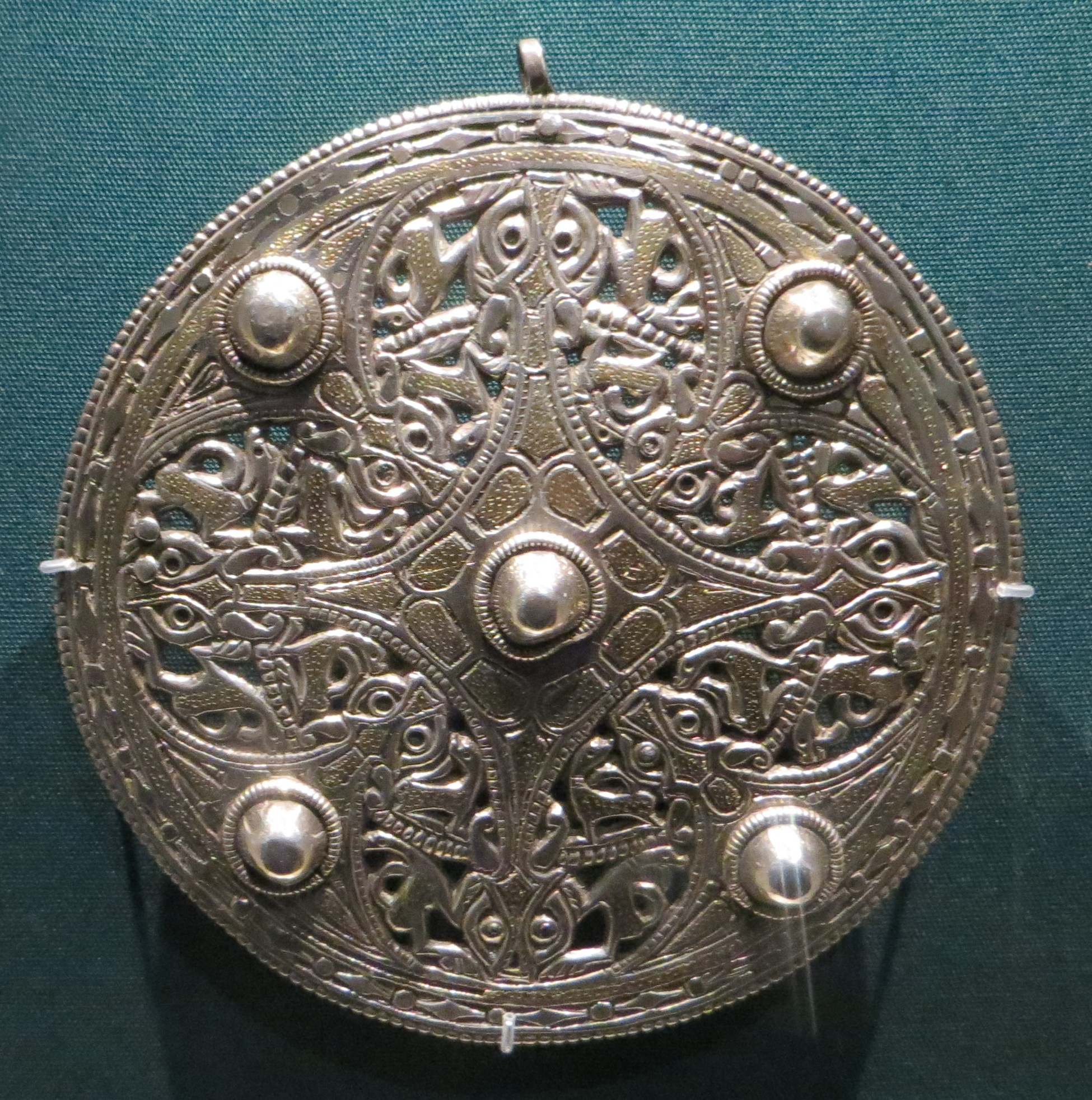
- Strickland Brooch as displayed in the British Museum
- Material: Silver and niello
- Size: 11.2 cm in diameter
- Created: Mid 9th Century AD
- Present location: British Museum, London
- Registration: M&ME 1949,0702.1

The Strickland Brooch is an Anglo-Saxon silver and niello disc brooch dated to the mid 9th century, now in the British Museum. Although its exact provenance is unknown, it is regarded by scholars as a rare and important example of an Anglo-Saxon brooch.

== Description ==
The Strickland Brooch is similar in appearance to the Fuller Brooch, also in the British Museum. Both brooches are circular in shape, made from sheet silver and inlaid with niello and gold. The Strickland Brooch is decorated with highly complex zoomorphic patterns that are deeply carved within the quatrefoil, whereas the Fuller Brooch is ornamented in a more anthropomorphic style. In the case of the Strickland Brooch, the design includes a series of Trewhiddle style dogs interspersed between canine-like heads.

== History of ownership ==
For a long time, the brooch belonged to the Strickland family of Yorkshire. Sold by Mrs W. H. Strickland at a Sotheby's auction in 1949 to an American buyer, it was denied an export licence and was acquired by the British Museum in the same year. The brooch is considered a masterpiece from the museum's Anglo-Saxon collection, and has played an important part in demonstrating the sophisticated artistry of English silversmiths during the early Middle Ages.
