= Trewhiddle =

Coordinates: 50.3251°N 4.8006°W

Trewhiddle: Cornish: Trewydhel
- Location within Cornwall
- Civil parish: Pentewan Valley
- Unitary authority: Cornwall
- Ceremonial county: Cornwall
- Region: South West
- Country: England
- Sovereign state: United Kingdom
- Post town: ST AUSTELL
- Postcode district: PL26
- Dialling code: 01726
- Police: Devon and Cornwall
- Fire: Cornwall
- Ambulance: South Western
- UK Parliament: St Austell and Newquay

Trewhiddle (Cornish: Trewydhel, meaning farmstead of the thicket) is a small settlement in south Cornwall, England, United Kingdom. It lies in the civil parish of Pentewan Valley and the ecclesiastical parish of St Austell. The nearest town is St Austell, approximately one mile to the north.

The Trewhiddle Hoard (see below) has given its name to a Trewhiddle style of decoration of metal in Anglo-Saxon art of the 9th century.

== Manor of Trewhiddle ==
Trewhiddle was formerly referred to as a manor which at one time contained two small settlements, Higher and Lower Trewhiddle. These settlements existed till at least 1891, but have since disappeared. The Trewhiddle area still includes two farms and Trewhiddle House.

== Archaeology ==
=== The Trewhiddle Hoard ===
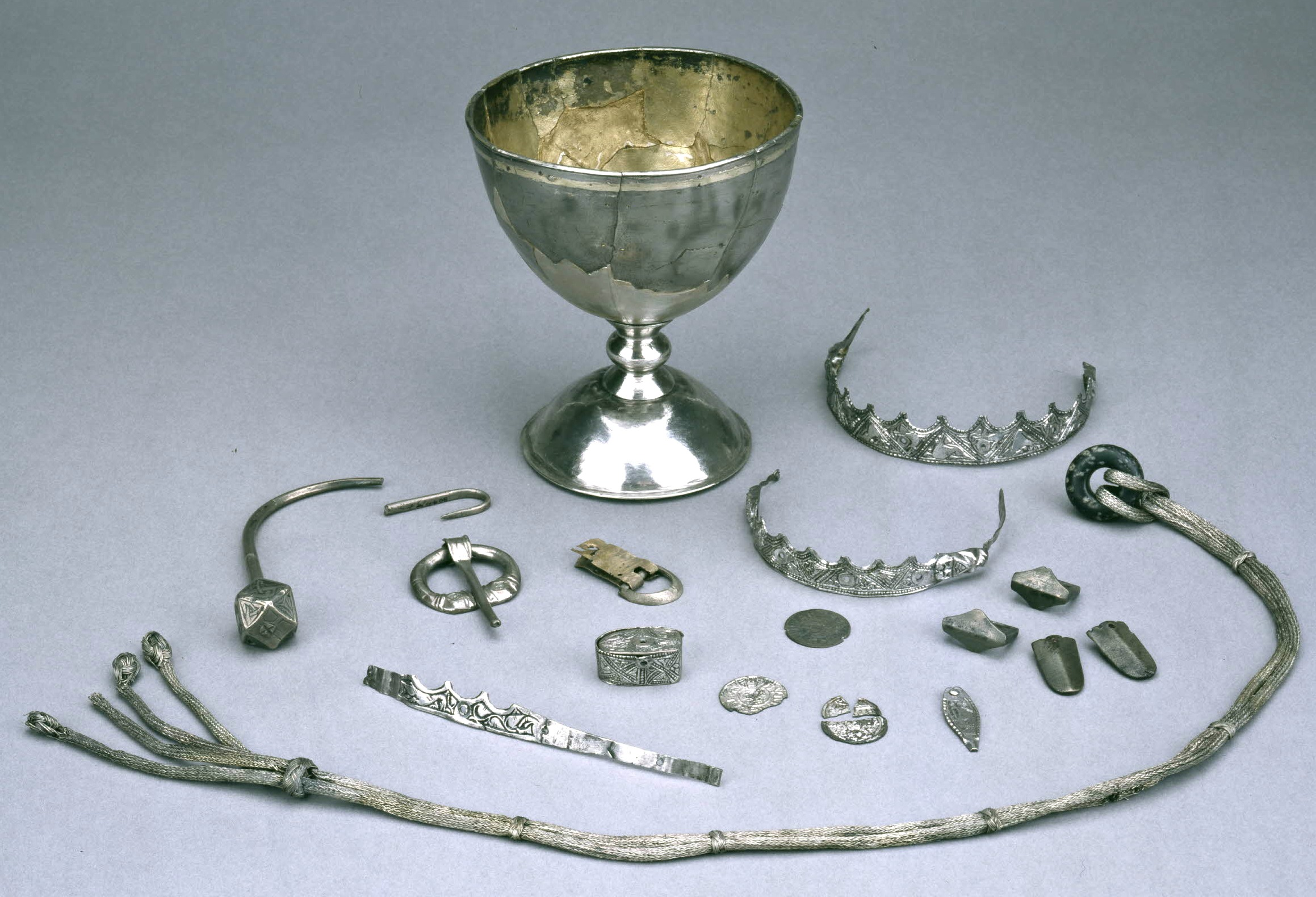
The Trewhiddle Hoard in the British Museum

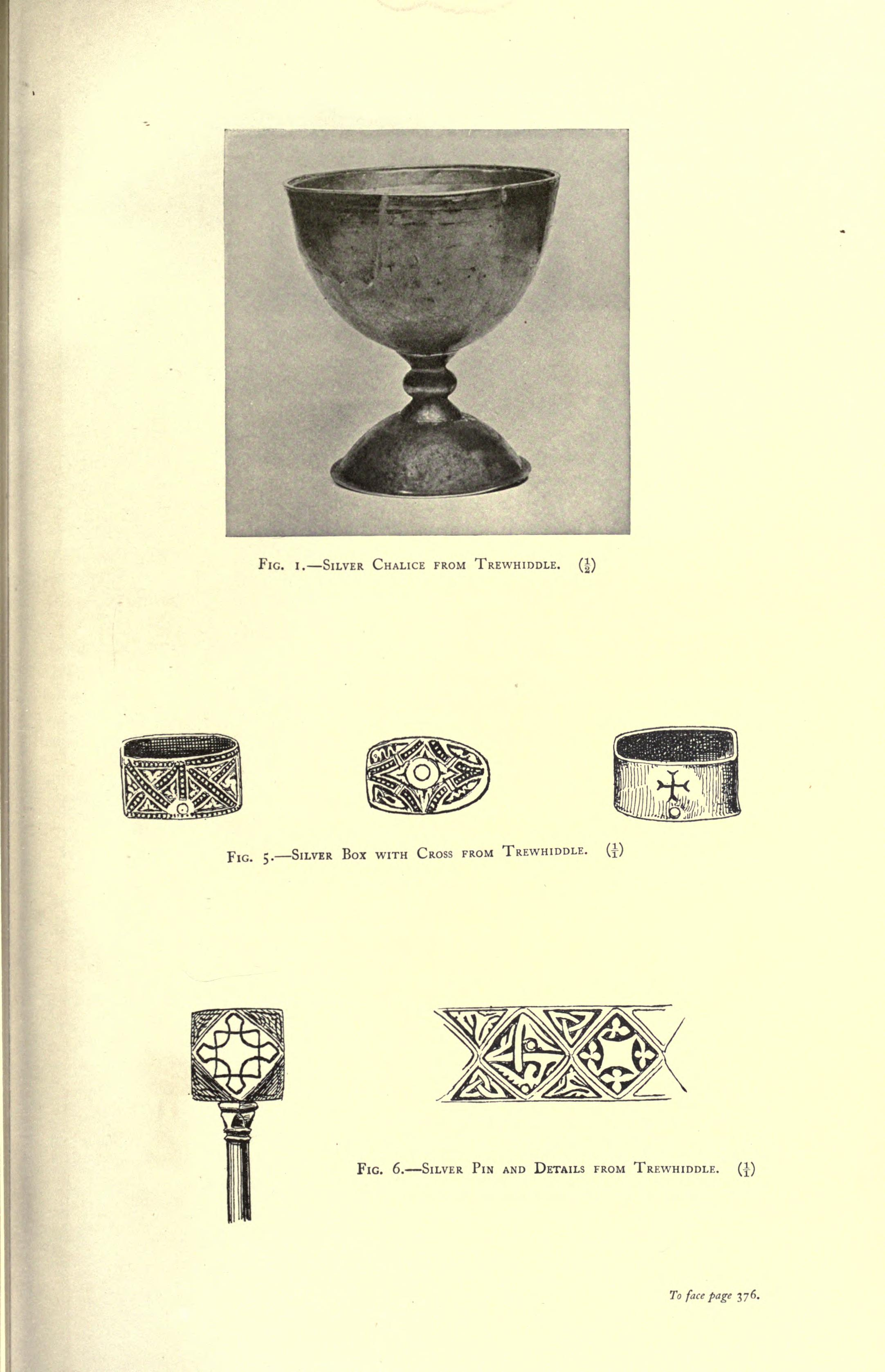
The silver chalice and other items

On 8 November 1774, miners streaming for tin uncovered a hoard of 114 Anglo-Saxon coins together with a silver chalice and other gold and silver objects. The coins, mostly from Mercia and Wessex, indicate that the hoard was hidden, possibly to protect it from Viking raiders, in around 868. The artefacts were originally collected by Philip Rashleigh who published a subsequent account. Some were later dispersed, but most of the hoard was presented to the British Museum. Many of the artefacts were decorated with stylized niello animals, a feature of Anglo-Saxon art which has since become known as Trewhiddle style decoration.

=== The Trewhiddle Ingot ===
Another remarkable discovery was made in 2003, when a 150-year-old lump of tungsten was found at Trewhiddle Farm. This may predate the earliest known smelting of the metal (which requires extremely high temperatures) and has led to speculation that it may have been produced during a visit by Rudolf Erich Raspe to Happy-Union mine (at nearby Pentewan) in the late eighteenth century. Raspe, best known as the author or translator of the Baron Munchausen stories, was also a chemist with a particular interest in tungsten.

== Trewhiddle House and estate ==
The legendary Cornish smuggler Cruel Coppinger may have been based on John Copinger, said to have purchased the Trewhiddle estate in the 1790s. In the 1840s, Trewhiddle House was home to the entomologist and botanist Francis Polkinghorne Pascoe. In the late twentieth century the house became a restaurant (the 'Trewhiddle Inn') and the estate a tourist campsite. Both house and estate have now been sold to developers and a number of 'New England–style' holiday villas have now been built. Little evidence remains of the former house other than a capped-off well and a small portion of the former walls which have been built into the landscaping.
