= Simon de Morville =

12th century English noble

Simon de Morville (died 1167), Lord of Kirkoswald and jure uxoris Lord of Burgh by Sands, was an English noble.

== Life ==
Simon was the son of Hugh de Morville and Beatrice de Beauchamp.

In 1136, Simon was jure uxoris Lord of Burgh by Sands, as his wife Ada was the heiress of her father William d'Engaine. Lands in Lazonby, Penrith and Kirkoswald were also in the procession of Simon. He died in 1167 in Cumberland, England. Simon was succeeded by his son Hugh. His widow Ada later remarried to Robert de Vaux.
