= Ranulf fitz Walter =

English 11th-century noble

Ranulf fitz Walter, also known as Randolph fitz Walter, was a prominent 11th-century noble. A Norman knight, Ranulf participated in William, Duke of Normandy's invasion of England in 1066. He obtained lands of Norfolk and Suffolk in England from Roger Bigod as tenant in chief. (Note: Lands held as shown in the 1086 Domesday survey: Knodishall, Peasenhall, Becclinga, Harpole and Saxmundham in Suffolk and Fritton, Appleton, Flitcham, Saxlingham, Bixley, Bramerton, Framingham [Earl and Pigot], Rockland [St Mary], Shotesham [All Saints and St Mary], Surlingham, Trowse, Yelverton, Ketteringham, Whissonsett, Yaxham, Griston, Thompson and Watton in Norfolk.) Ranulf was succeeded by his eldest son Gibert.

== Marriage and issue ==
Ranulf married Matilda, daughter of Ralph I de Langetot, they are known to have had the following issue:

- Gilbert fitz Ranulf, married Richildis.
- Agnes fille Ranulf, married Robert II de Vaux of Pentney, had issue.
- Simon fitz Ranulf.
