= Robert de Vaux, Sheriff of Cumberland =

English noble

Robert de Vaux
- Baron of Gilsland
- Died: c.1195
- Noble family: de Vaux

Robert de Vaux, also known as Robert de Vallibus, (died c.1195), Baron of Gilsland, was a prominent 12th-century English noble, who served as Sheriff of Cumberland in 1175 and 1176.

== Biography ==
Vaux was the eldest son of Hubert I de Vaux, Lord of Gilsland and his wife Grace. Robert succeeded his father in 1165, as a confirmation of Gilsland was given to him by King Henry II of England. He founded the Augustinian Lanercost Priory in c.1169. Robert was required to pay forty shillings for scutage, for not participating in the Norman invasion of Ireland by Henry II. Robert was appointed in Michelmas 1174 as the Sheriff of Cumberland and also served his last term from Michelmas 1183. In 1186 he was fined a hundred marks for a variety of offences including allowing prisoners to escape. He held Carlisle against the Scottish invasion of Cumberland in 1173 and 1174 by King William I of Scotland, surrendering the castle after a second siege in 1174. Robert was heir to his uncle Randolph, who died without issue.

Robert, married Ada, widow of Simon de Morville, the daughter and heiress of William de Engaine, died without surviving issue. Robert's son William died during his father's lifetime. Robert died circa 1195 and was succeeded by his brother Ranulf.
