= De Vaux family =

de Vaux (Vans, Vance, Vallibus) is the surname of an old Norman noble family.

== French origin ==
The family held Norman estates as Lord Vaux.

== England ==
Robert and Aitard de Vaux followed in the retinue of Roger Bigod during William of Normandy's invasion of England. They obtained lands in Norfolk.

Hubert de Vaux obtained the barony of Gilsland, in Cumbria and Northumberland. Ranulf de Vaux obtained the lordships of Tryermayne, Sowerby, Carlatton and Hubbertby, in Cumbria. Robert de Vaux received the Barony of Dalston in Cumbria, however returned to Normandy. The family of Strickland of Gilsland descend from Robert de Strickland, grandson of Hubert de Vaux of Gilisland. The Willes family of Warwickshire, also descend from Hubert de Vaux of Gilisland. Three members of the de Vaux family were given the status of knight of garter. The De Vaux family was given land after their service in the battle of Hastings.

== Scotland ==
Adam de Vaux son of Hubert de Vaux of Gillesland, obtained lands in Carrick.

William de Vaux son of John de Vaux of Dalton, obtained the barony of Direlton, in Lothian. The Vass of Lochslin family, septs of the Clan Ross and Clan Munro, descend from John de Vaux of Direlton.

== Ireland ==
The Vances appear to have originated from an ancestor of de Vaux from Scotland.
