= Insular crozier =

Type of processional bishop's staff

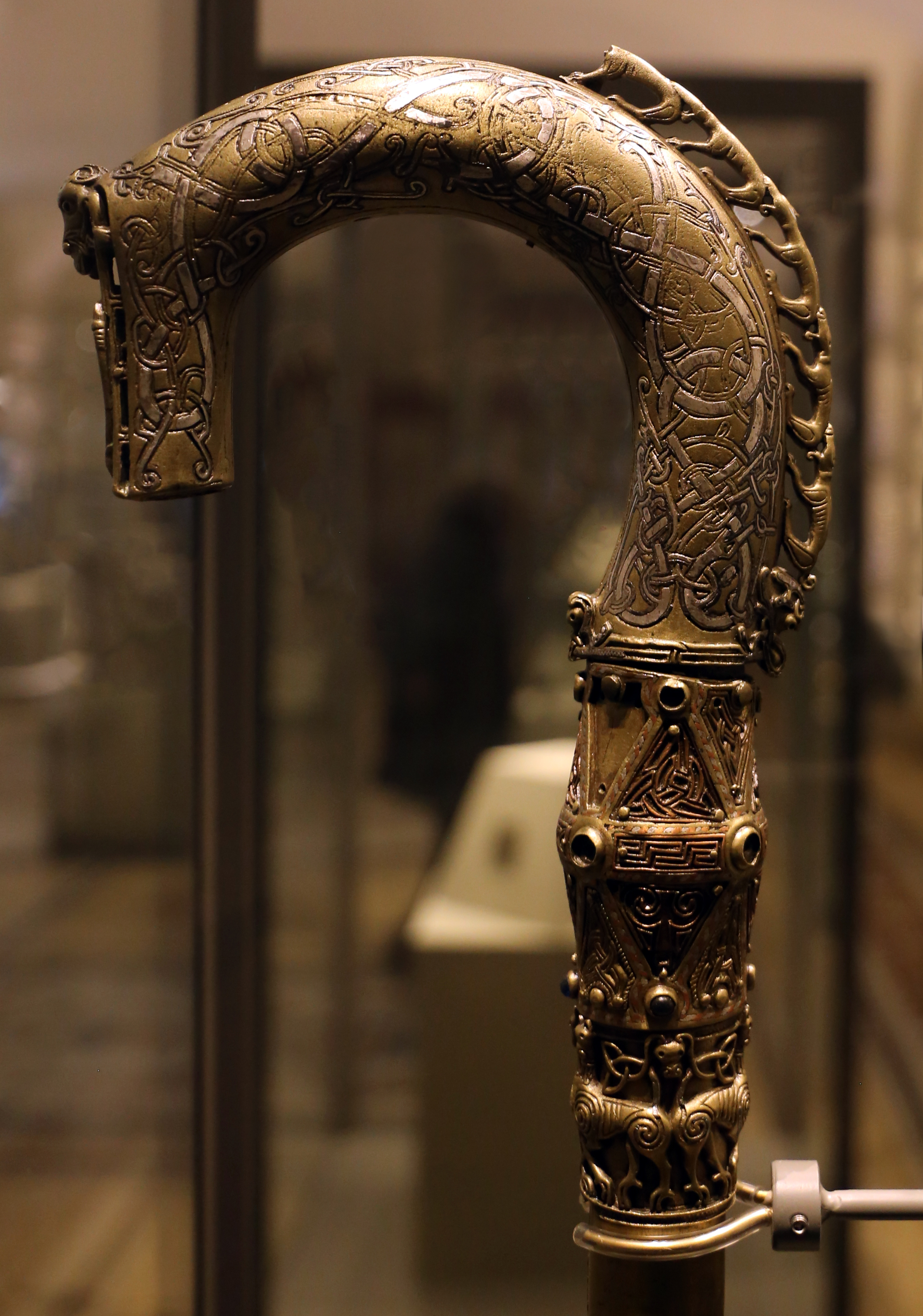
Crook of the late 11th century Clonmacnoise Crozier. National Museum of Ireland – Archaeology, Kildare Street, Dublin

An Insular crozier is a type of processional bishop's staff (crozier) produced in Ireland and Scotland between 800 and 1200. They are distinguished from mainland European types by their curved and open crooks, and drop (the hollow box-like extension at the end of the crook). By the end of the 12th century, production of Irish croziers had largely ended, but examples continued to be reworked and added to throughout the Romanesque and Gothic periods. Although many of the croziers are associated with 5th- and 6th-century saints, the objects were not made until long after the saints had died. A majority originate from around the 9th century, with a number further embellished between the 11th and 13th centuries.

Croziers were symbols of office for bishops or abbots. Their form is based on the idea of the shepherd as pastor of his flock and was popular from the early days of Christianity. The first known mention of the attribute in relation to Ireland is from 431 CE, and in the context of the conversion of the Irish population to Christianity. The first Insular staffs were produced in the 9th and 10th centuries during periods of political and religious upheaval in Ireland, when authority was often seen as needing to be made explicit, including during the Viking invasions. A number of examples, such as the Cath Bhuaidh, found in Iona, are known to have been carried into battle against the Vikings as talismans. Insular croziers tend to be around 1.2 meters in length, the same size as a large walking stick.

Most have an inner wooden core onto which tubular copper alloy (bronze) plates were attached. The crooks tend to be highly decorated with elements such as openwork and animal designs. As of 2014, fewer than 20 surviving fully intact examples were known, in addition to 60 fragments in various states of completeness.

The major extant examples include the Clonmacnoise Crozier (thought to be amongst the first examples of Irish metalwork of the medieval period), the Kells Crozier (9th to 11th centuries), St Mel's Crozier (10th and 12th century), the River Laune Crozier (late 10th century), the Lismore Crozier (c. 1100), and the Scottish Coigreach and St Fillan’s Crozier. The majority of surviving Insular croziers are held in the National Museum of Ireland, National Museum of Scotland and the British Museum.

== Ecclesiastical and secular functions ==
It is unknown exactly what their function in Irish medieval society was, but they were probably of ceremonial use, and some may have held relics in their drops. As the art historian Anthony T. Lucas points out, at the time the "most prestigious of all Irish relics and the one most frequently mentioned down the years was ... the Bachall Iosa or Staff of Jesus ... [said ] to have been received directly from Heaven by St. Patrick." Although the croziers are often associated with early Christian Irish saints from the 600-800 era, it is not thought that the wooden cores of the staffs date from that period. However some (but not all) historians think that the drops may have been constructed as containers for relics.

As undoubted symbols of wealth and power, the croziers may have at times been used for solemnising treaties, swearing oaths, or even as battle talismans. The antiquarian George Petrie noted how, in Ireland, relics of saints "used to be carried to distant places on solemn occasions, in order that rival chieftains might be sworn upon them, so much that the word mionna, which means enshrined relics, came to denote both a relic and an oath." The annuals recounting the life of St. Finnchu of Brigown, County Cork, mentions a battle against a king of Ulaid where the saint approaches the field with a crozier as a talisman.

The earliest known Irish crozier, dating to 596 AD and entirely made of wood, was found in a bog at Lemanaghan, County Offaly. Representations of croziers appear in multiple other Insular art formats, including manuscripts, high crosses and stone carvings.

== Characteristics ==
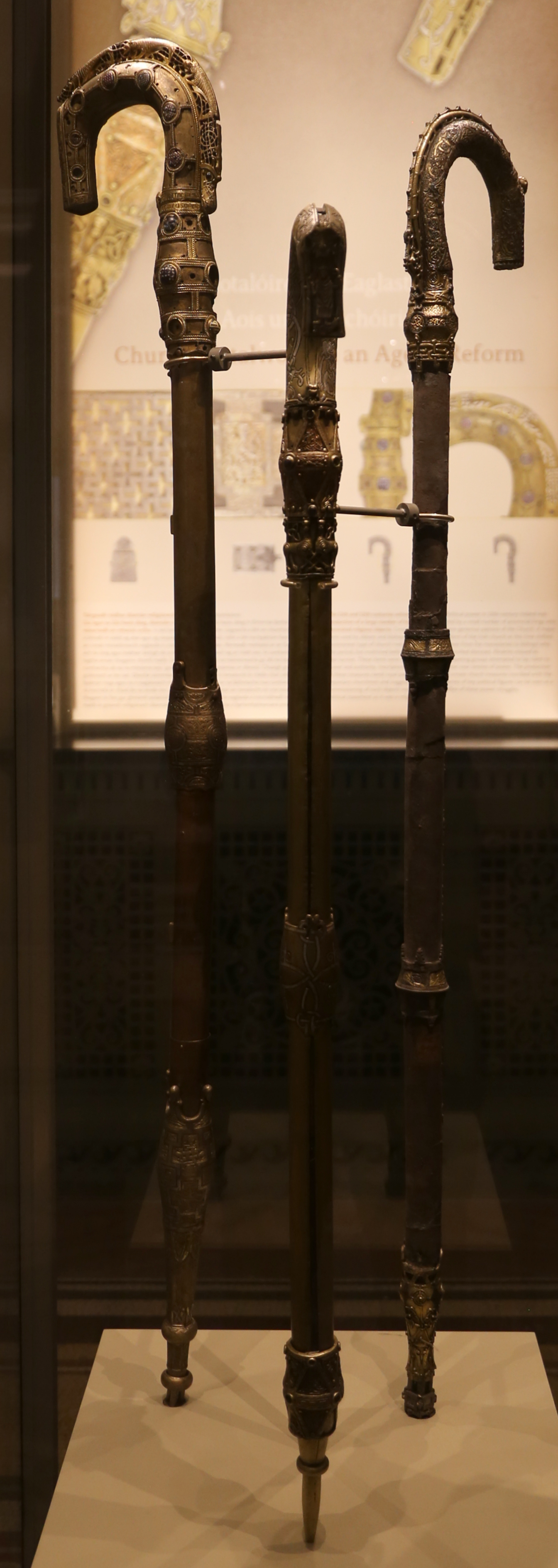
The Lismore, Clonmacnoise and River Laune croziers on display at the National Museum of Ireland

Insular croziers were probably made in workshops specialising in metal inlay techniques. The art historian Griffin Murray speculates that the master craftsman behind the Clonmacnoise Crozier may also be responsible for two other extant examples. The croziers vary in size, material, and amount and quality of decoration. A typical length is 1.2 meters, with the Prosperous Crozier from County Kildare being both the oldest and 1.33 meters the longest. The major components are the shaft or staff and attached base, crook, and knop, with the crook, knop and ferrule being the most decorated elements.

Only five croziers have inscriptions. Of these, only the Kells and Lismore Croziers have the lettering that is still legible. The Lismore Crozier contains both the name of the smith (Nechtan), and the name of the Bishop of Lismore who commissioned it, while the Kells Crozier names the smith as Conduilig, and its commissioner as Malfinnen, Archbishop of Leinster.

=== Crook ===
The crooks are positioned on top of the shaft and are typically highly decorated with silver, gold, glass, and niello-style inlay and openwork crests, while the crook of the Aghadoe crozier is crafted from walrus ivory. They ornamented may include interlace designs, geometric patterns and zoomorphic (portraying humans as non-human animals) figures. The animal designs in the earliest example are depicted in a naturalistic manner, while many of the later examples bear influence from both the Ringerike and later Urnes styles of Viking art. Some of the Ringerike style animals bear close resemblance to figures on the margins of ninth-century Insular brooches.

The designs on the crook of the Clonmacnoise Crozier are in the Ringerike style and include snake-like animals with ribbon-shaped bodies arranged, according to art historian Patrick Wallace, "in tightly woven knots", while the crest contains a series of "gripping dogs". The Lismore Crozier contains three open-mouthed animals "connected in an Urnes-style mesh."

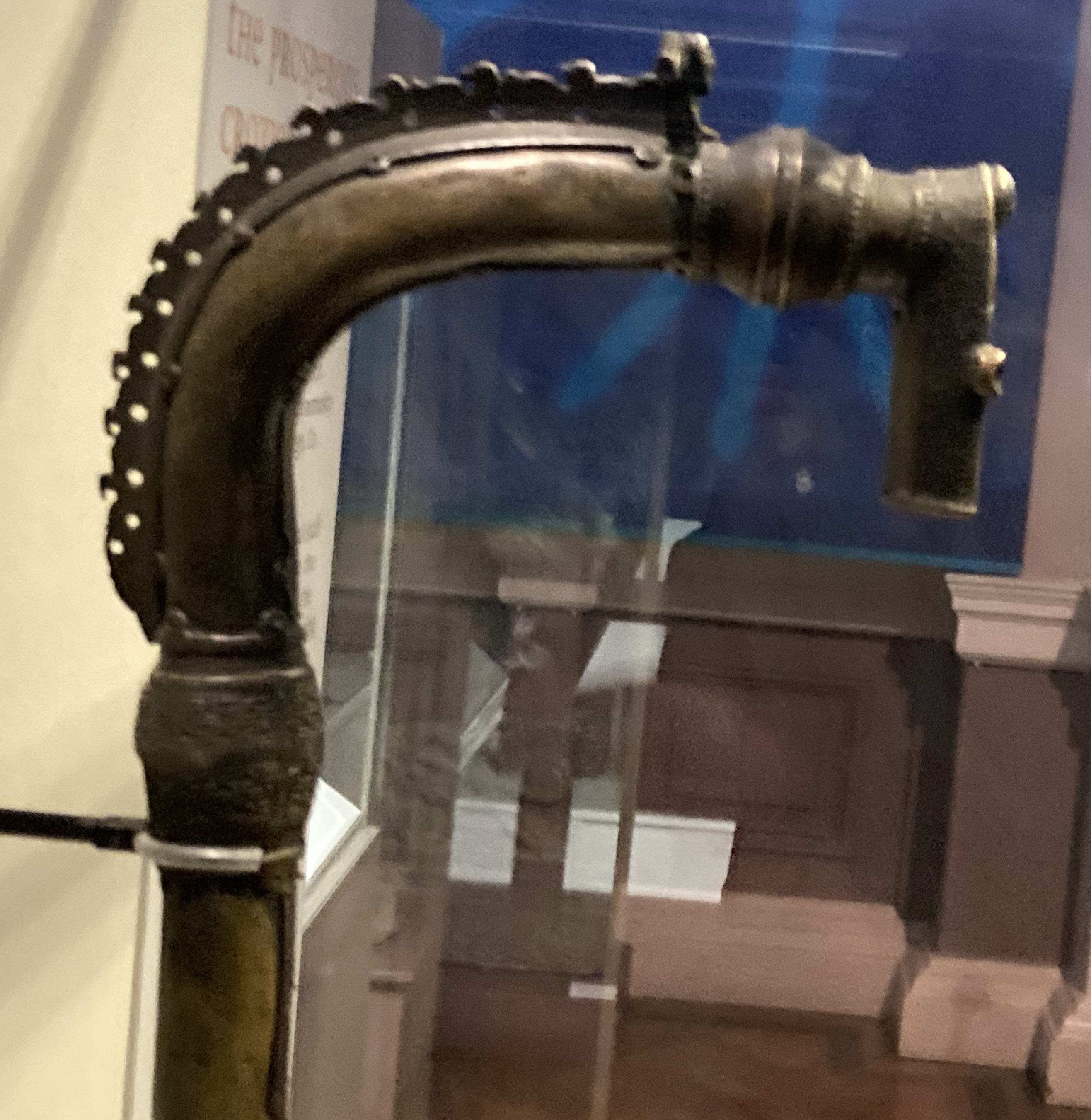
The unusually elongated crook of the late 9th or early 10th century Prosperous Crozier

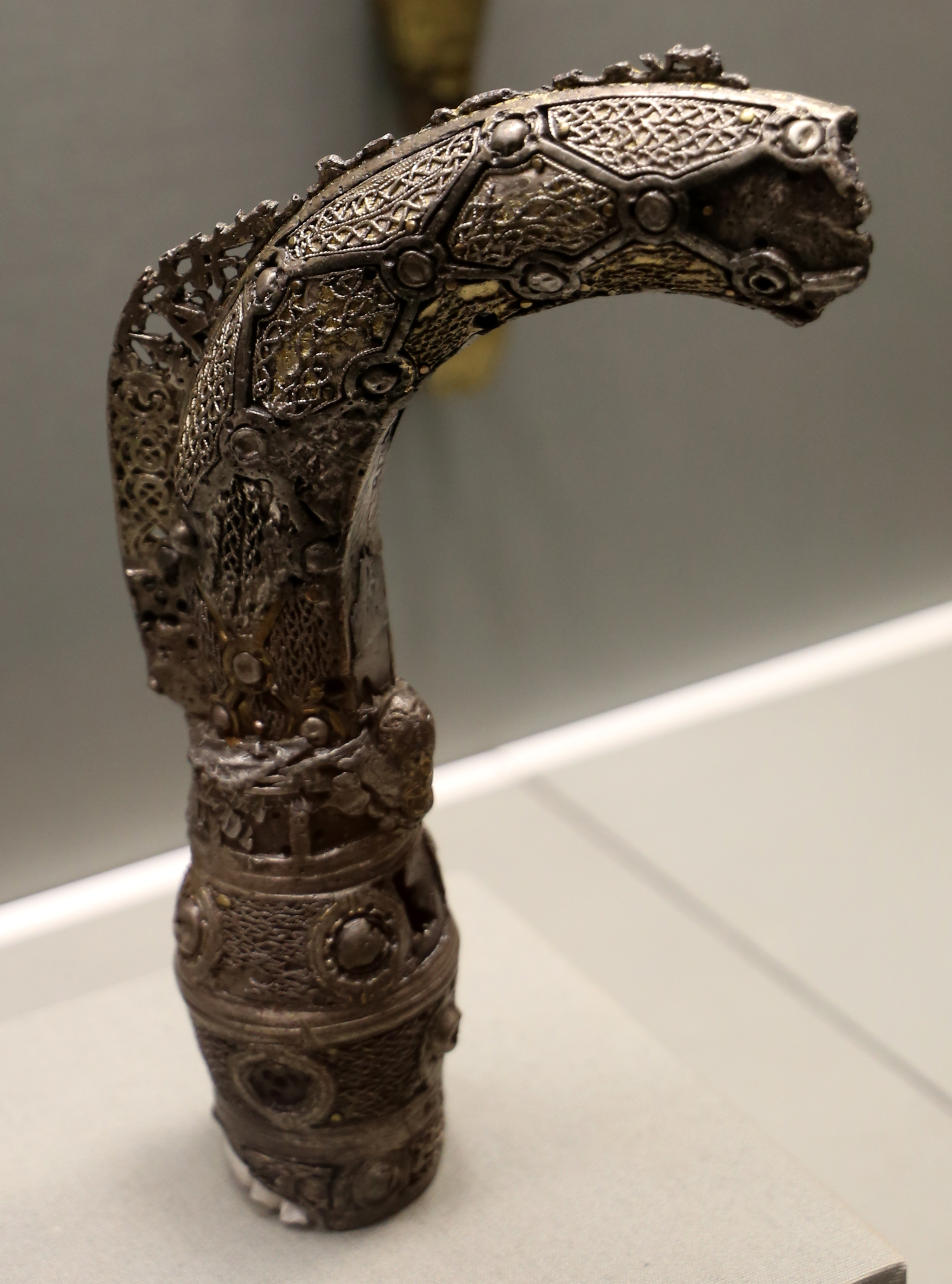
The Lough Rea Crozier, c. 1110. Although the staff is lost, the complete crozier would have been one of the finest examples.

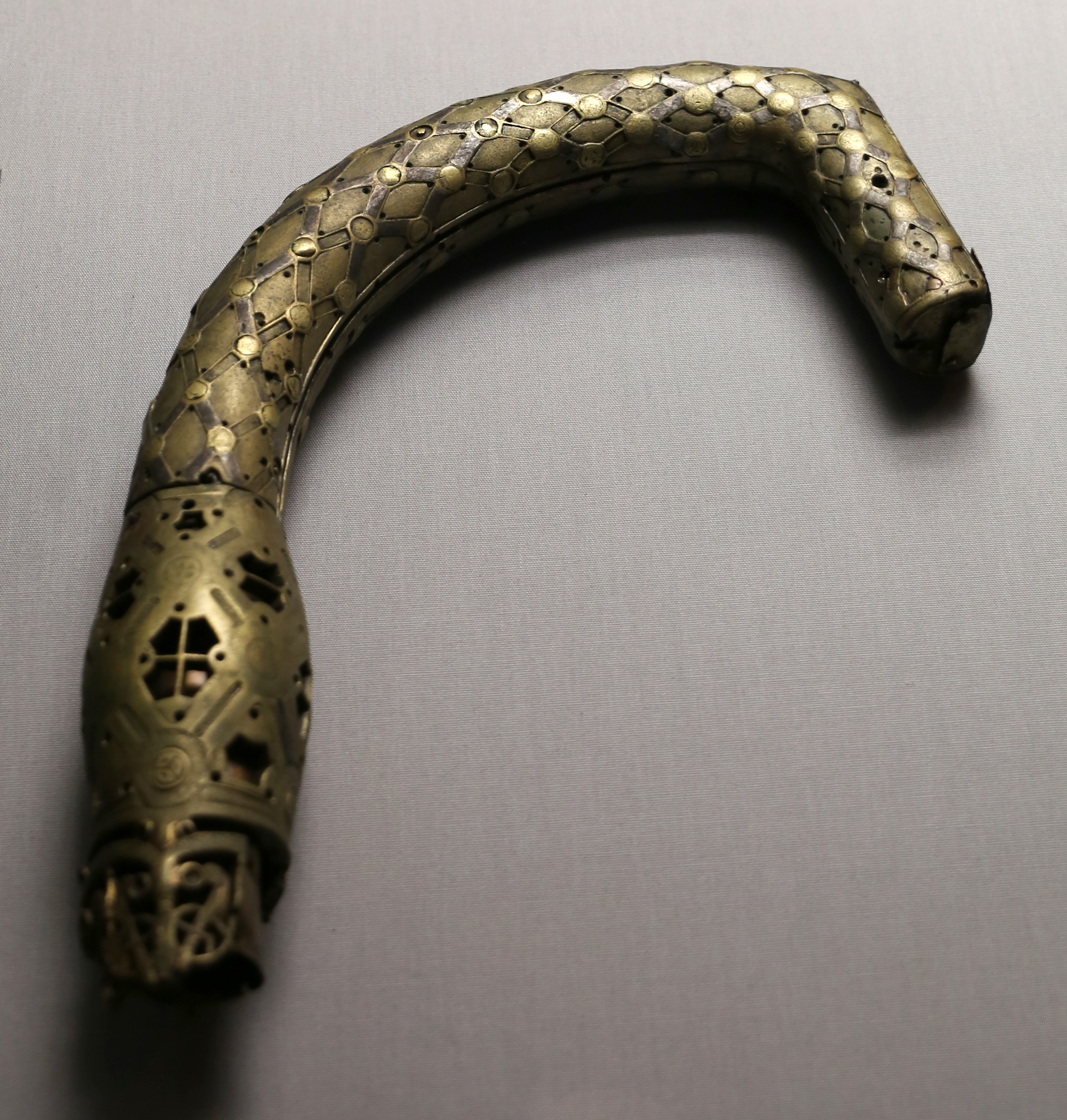
Crozier head found in Rath, County Clare, 11th or 12th century, NMI

=== Drop ===
The majority of Insular crozier's crooks terminate with a flat drop, typically formed from an inserted and functional metal plaque, and a highly ornate openwork drop plate, studded with jewels, as with the Lismore Crook. The plaques often have an animal (or, less often human) head at the top, below which a separate structure (known as the drop-plate) was attached. Based on carvings on a number of high crosses, including that at Ahenny, County Tipperary, it can be assumed that the clerics held the staffs with both hands at chest height, with the drop facing outward. As thus the most visible portion of the crozier, the drops were the obvious focus point for figurative art, an element that is, apart from zoomorphism, otherwise almost entirely absent in Insular metalwork. While a number of examples retain their precious metal jewels, in general most of the Insular crozier have lost their drops, presumably through plunder.

This led to theories in the 19th century that the drops acted as containers for smaller relics of saints, while the metal casing held the saint's original wooden staffs. However, these claims have been in doubt since the mid-20th century, and there is no evidence to support the theories. An exception is the Lismore Crozier, where two small relics and a linen cloth were found inside the crook during a 1966 refurbishment.

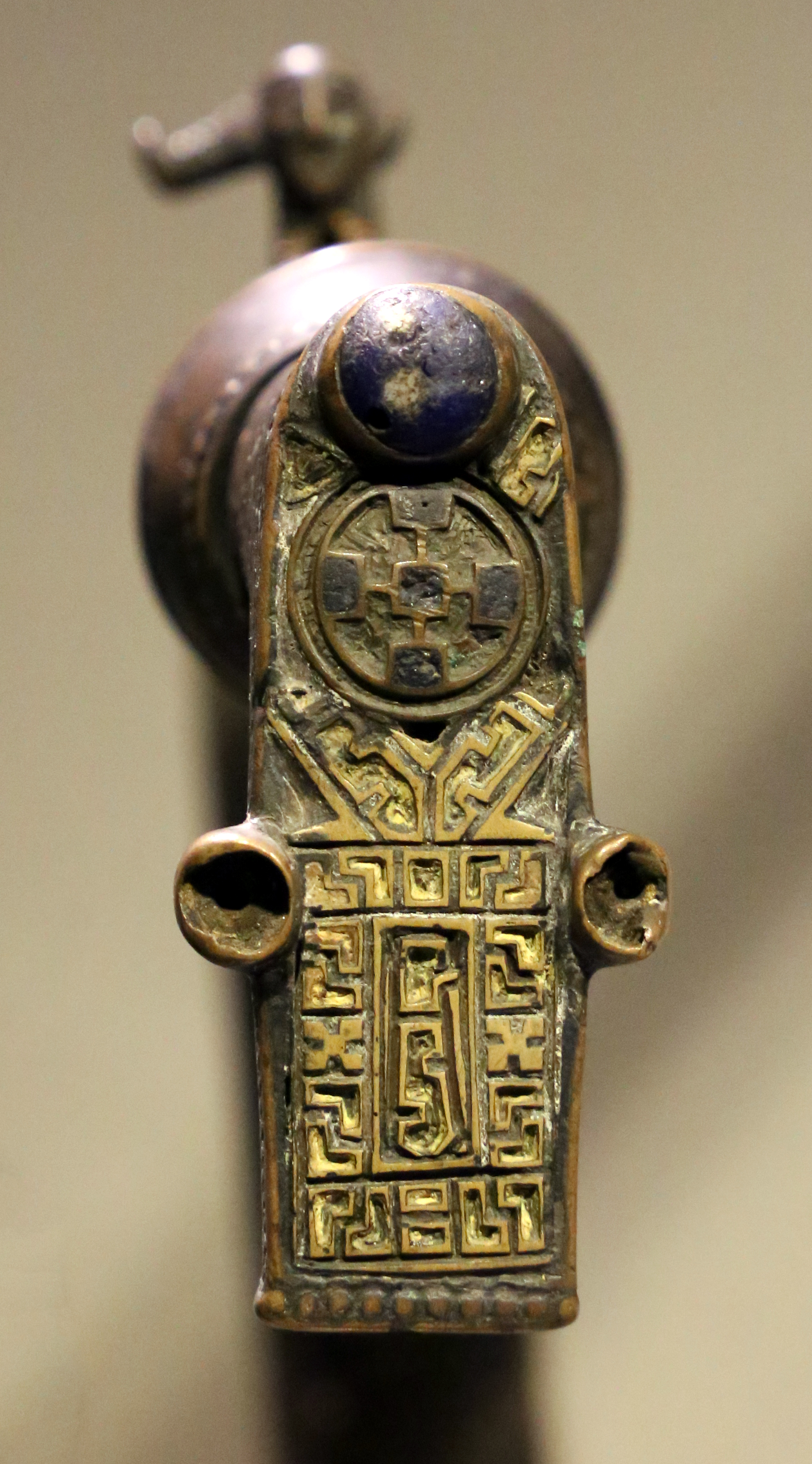
Drop-plate of the Prosperous Crozier

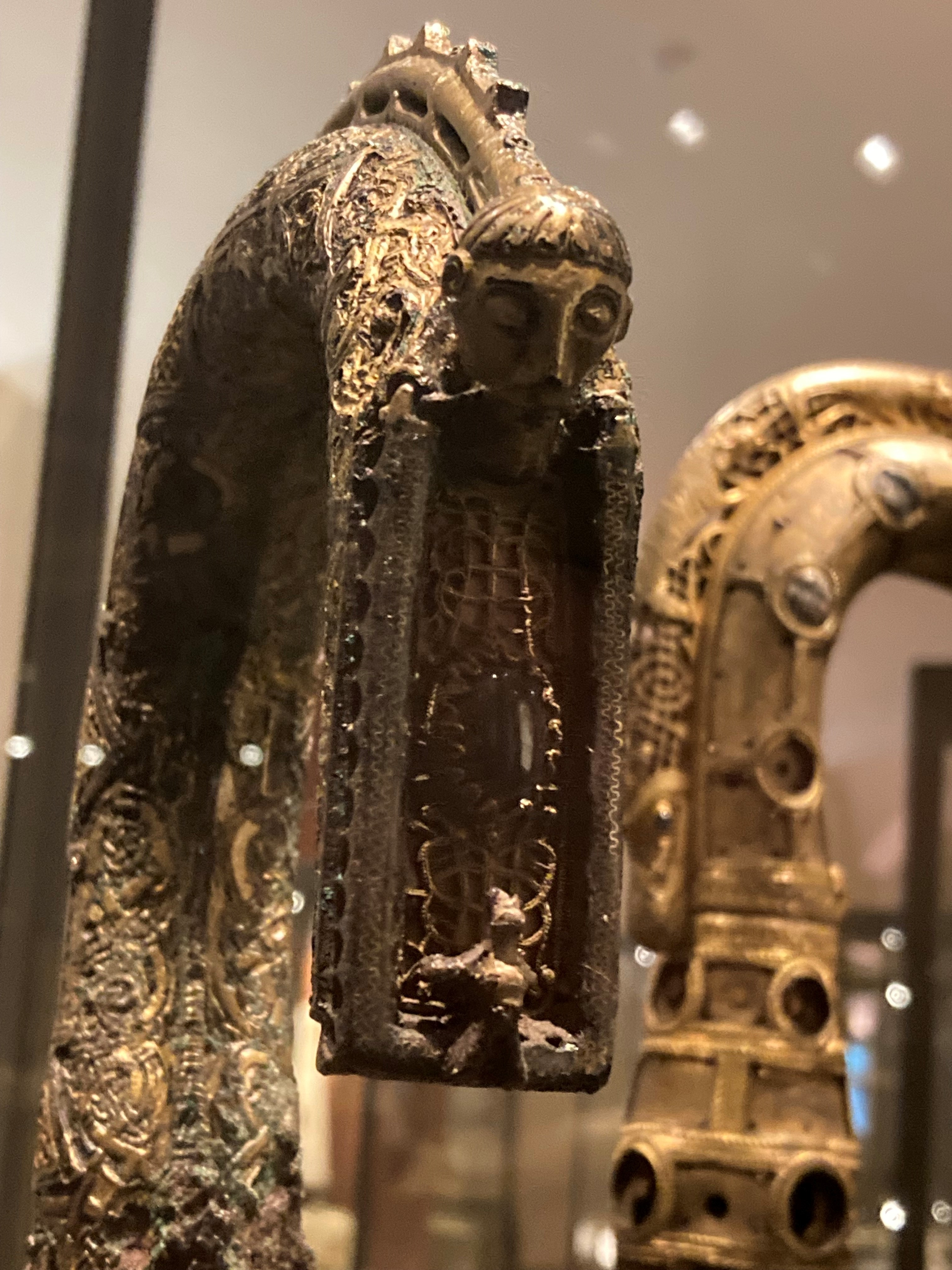
Detail, River Laune Crozier

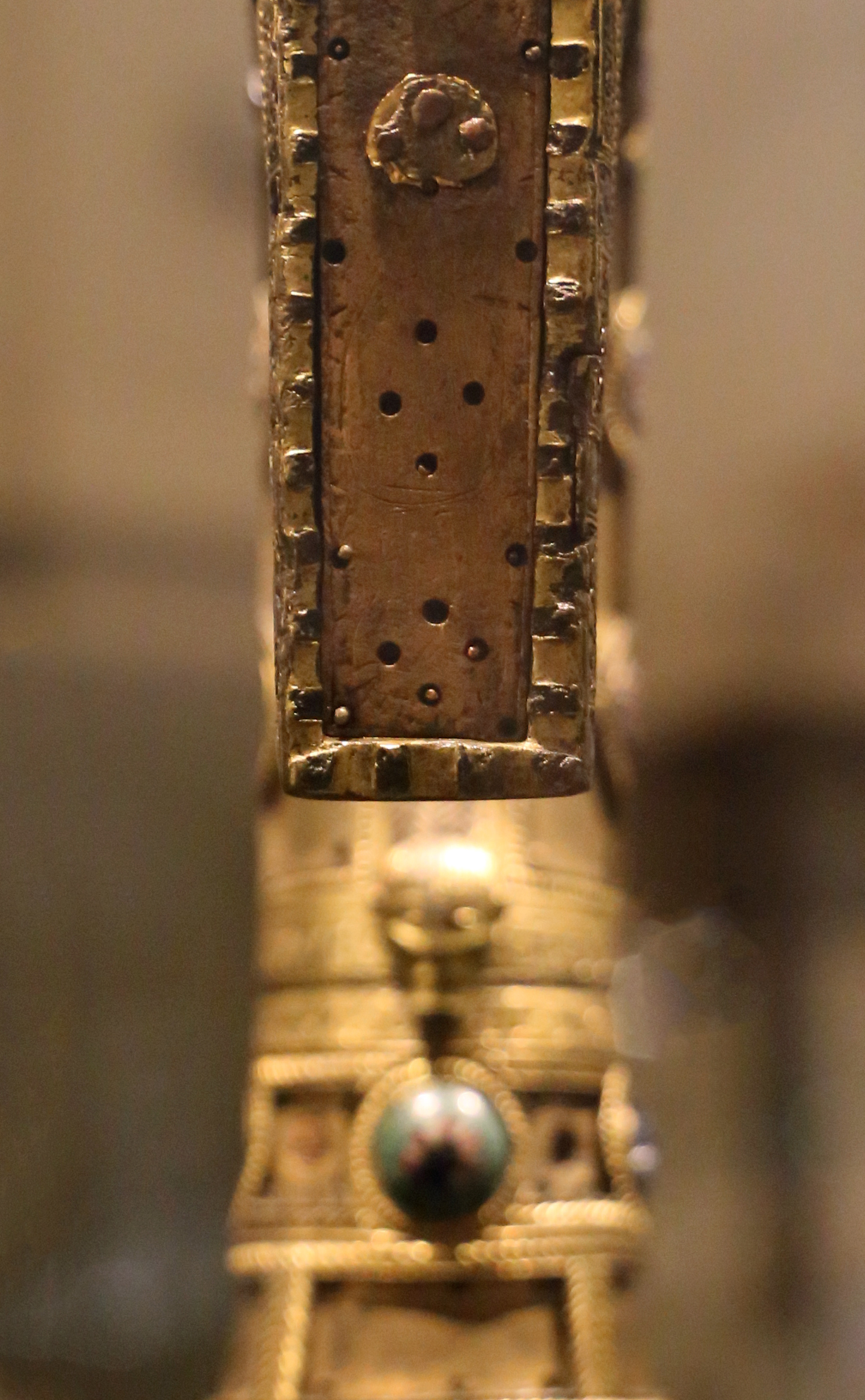
Drop of the Lismore Crozier, with empty compartment

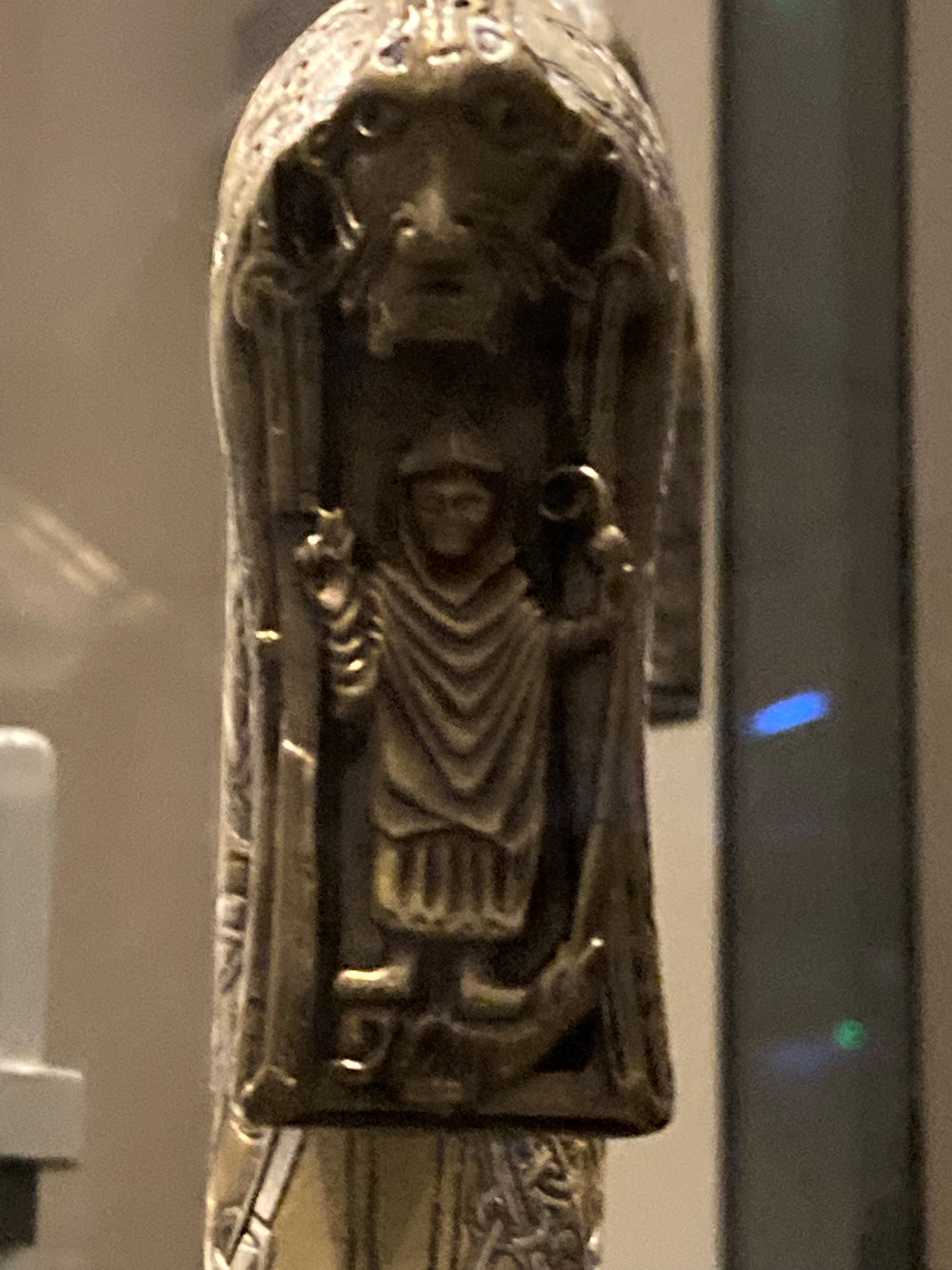
A cleric slaying a dragon on the drop of the Clonmacnoise Crozier

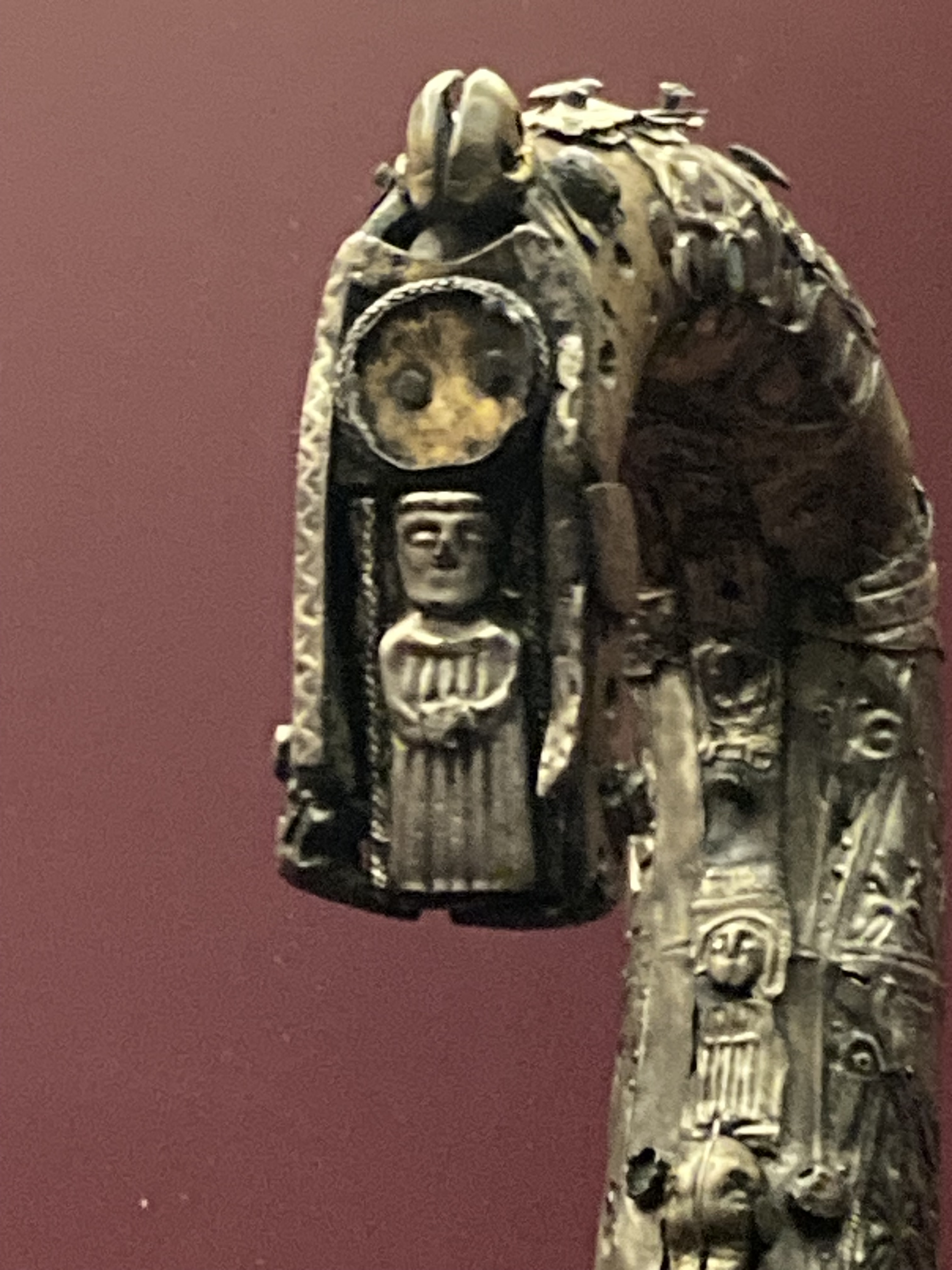
The Ardclinis Crozier, 1050–1100 AD

=== Shaft ===
The shaft is generally formed from a wooden core, usually of yew wood, sheeted with metal tubing, and often millefiori discs and inlaid glass bosses. This core was used to support the weight of the hook, given that the metal casing is usually comparatively thin. The tubing was typically fitted with metal plating, usually of copper-alloy or silver, and attached by nails and rivets. In earlier examples, the hook was formed from two separate plates fastened by a crest (coat of arms) and a binding strip, while the drop (the plate at the front end of the hook) was attached separately. In some Romanesque crosiers, the crest is on the same plate as the crook, with only the drop as a separate attachment.

The shaft gets progressively narrower after the lowest knope before tapering to spike or ferrule.

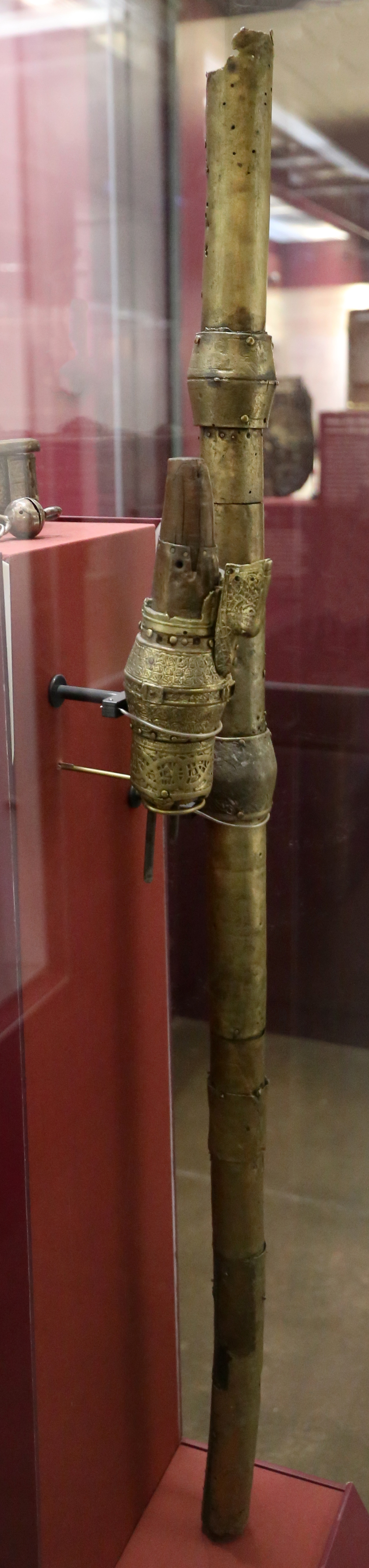
Staff and fragment with two knops from the St. Columba’s Crozier, 8th or 9th century

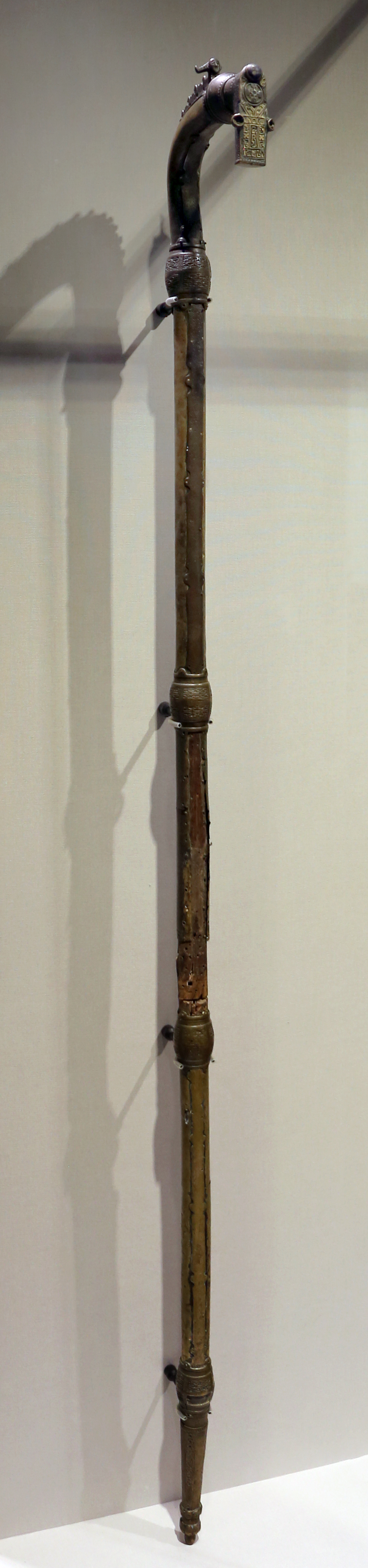
General view of the Prosperous Crozier, late 9th or early 10 century

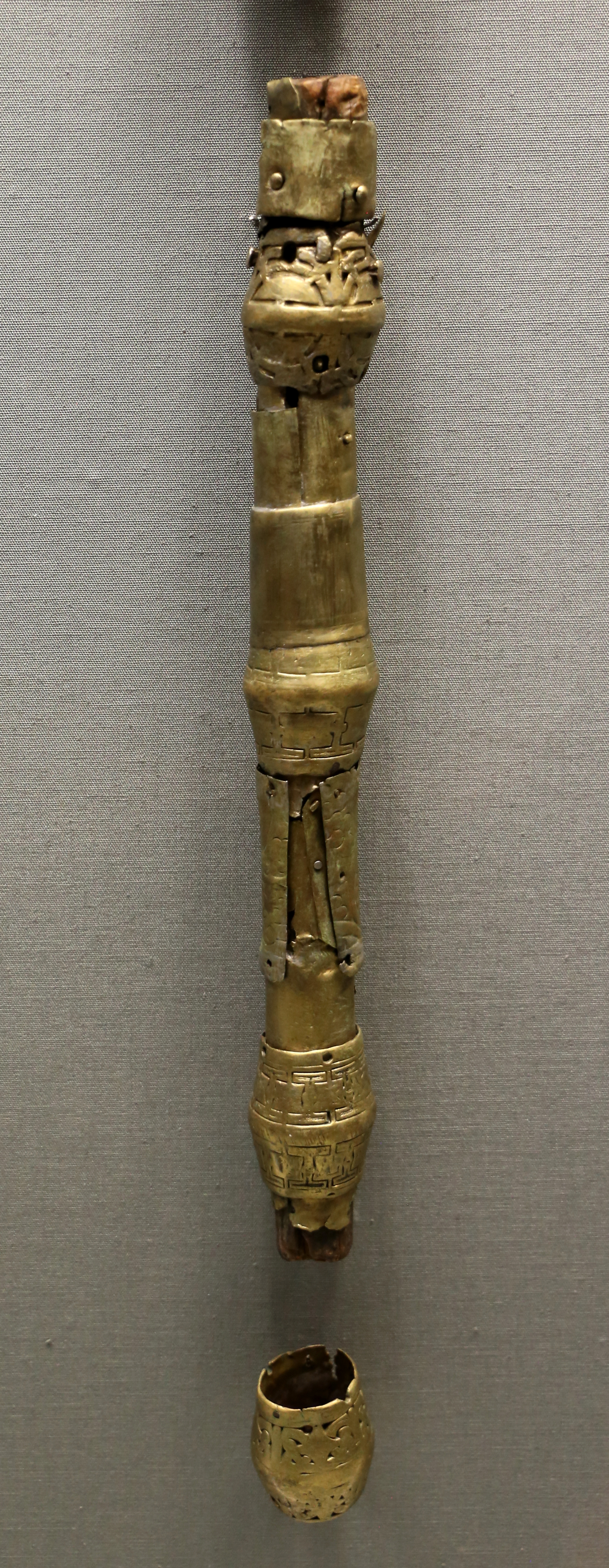
Broken crosier found in Kilmacduagh, County Galway, c. 1110

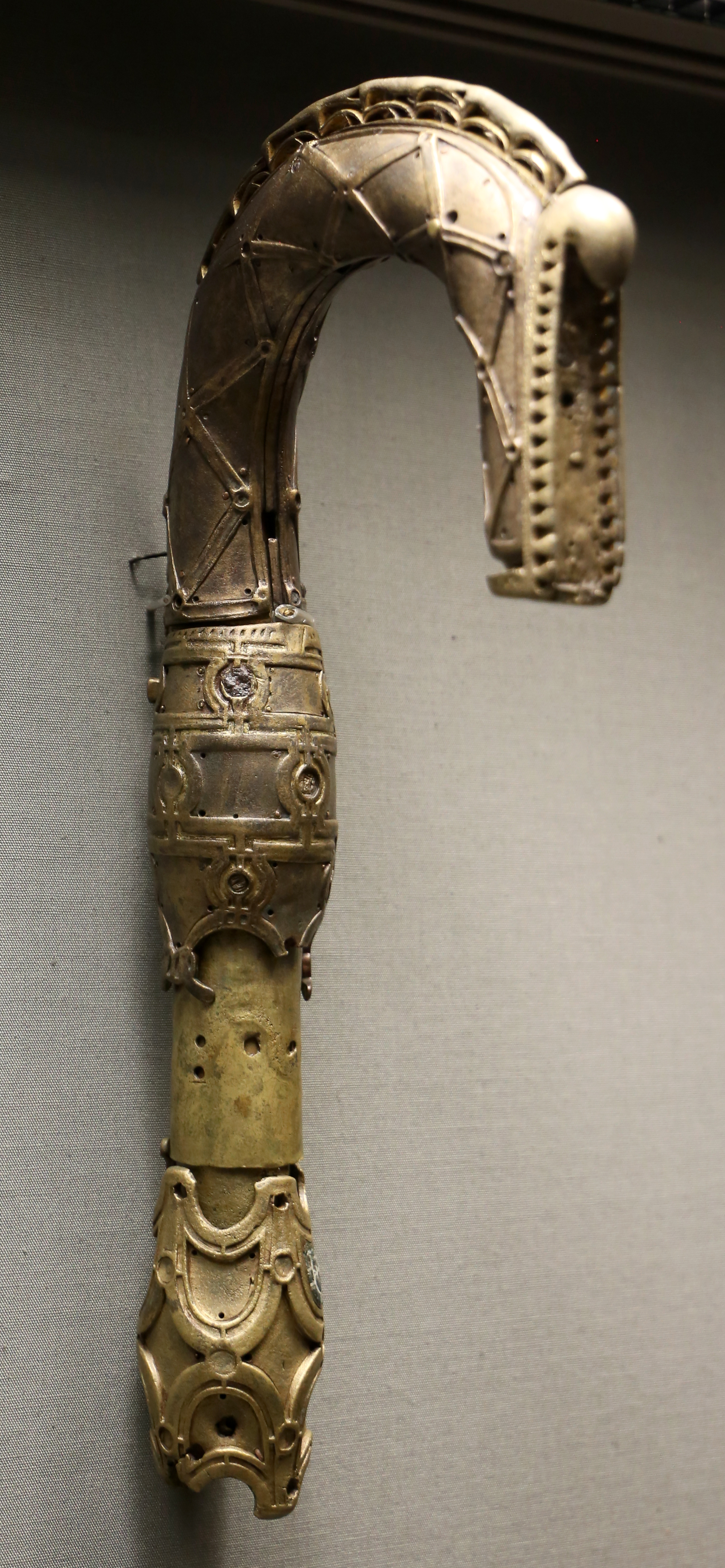
Crozier of Dysert O'Dea (also known as St. Tola's Crozier), 11th century

=== Knops ===
The shafts of the extant croziers are lined with between three and five decorative knops; that is separately cast, protruding barrel-shaped metal fittings. They all cast in bronze and are either cylindrical or biconical and fully wrap around the shaft. Typical decorative elements include inserted triangular and rectangular plaques ornamented with inlaid silver, interlace, glass studs, and enamel. The individual knopes are usually placed equally distant from each other and separated by lengths of open, plain copper-alloy. Four seems to have been the usual number, while those, such as the Clonmacnoise crozier, that have three are usually shorter overall and may have lost some of their length at some stage (probably when they were broken apart to make them easier to fold and thus hide from Viking and later Norman invaders). Knops were some times reused and attached to other croziers, the usual case for those that have five. Examples containing re-used knops include St. Dympna’s and St. Columba’s croziers.

In all Insular examples, the upper and middle knopes are separately cast, while (excepting the Clonmacnoise Crosier) the lower knope is fused with the ferrule. The designs on the upper knop of the Clonmacnoise and River Laune croziers are similar to those at the lower portion of their crooks. Both the Clonmacnoise and St. Columba’s croziers have decorative collars below their upper knopes. Knops are not unique to Insular croziers and can be found in many contemporary and later European examples.

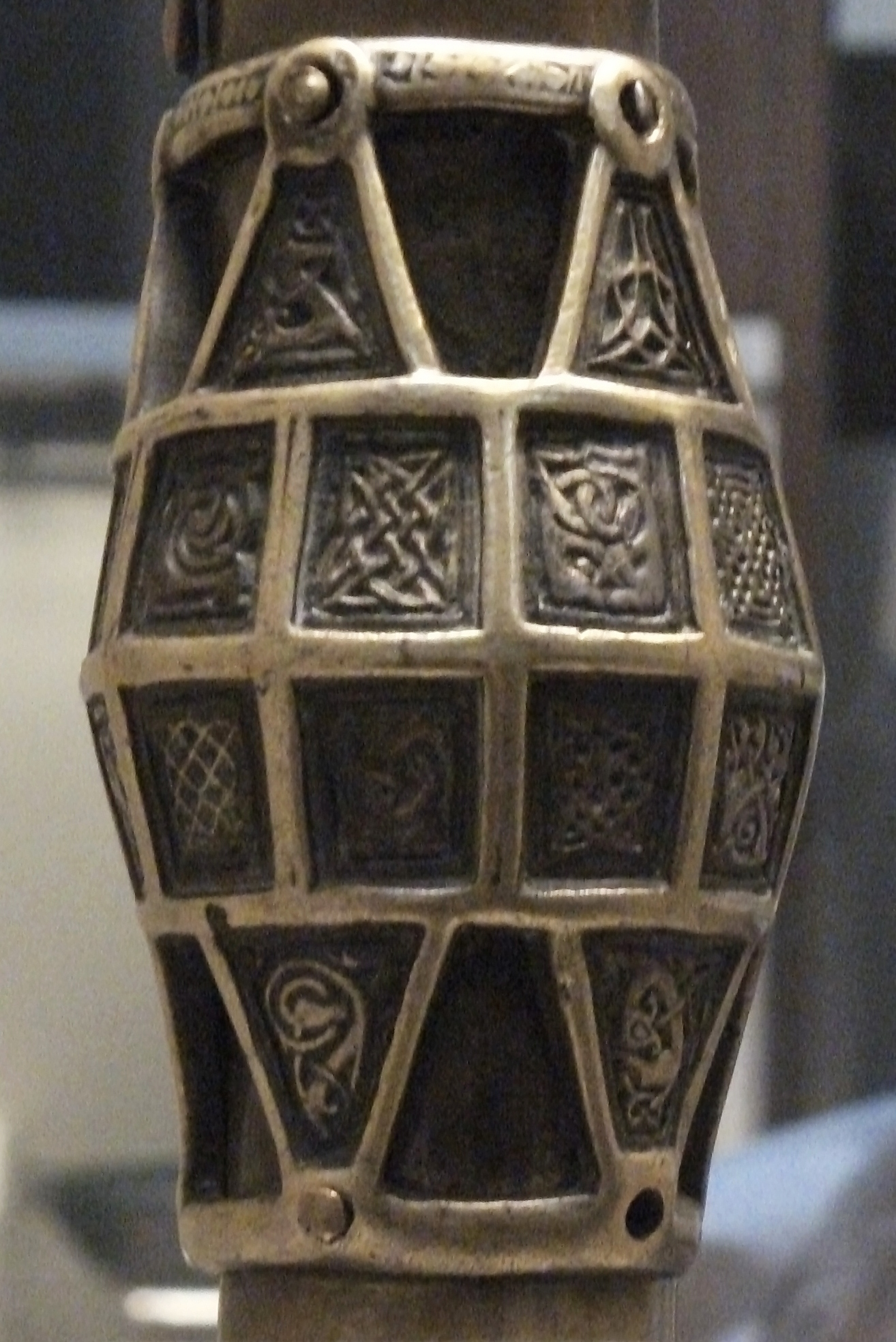
Upper knope on the Kells Crozier

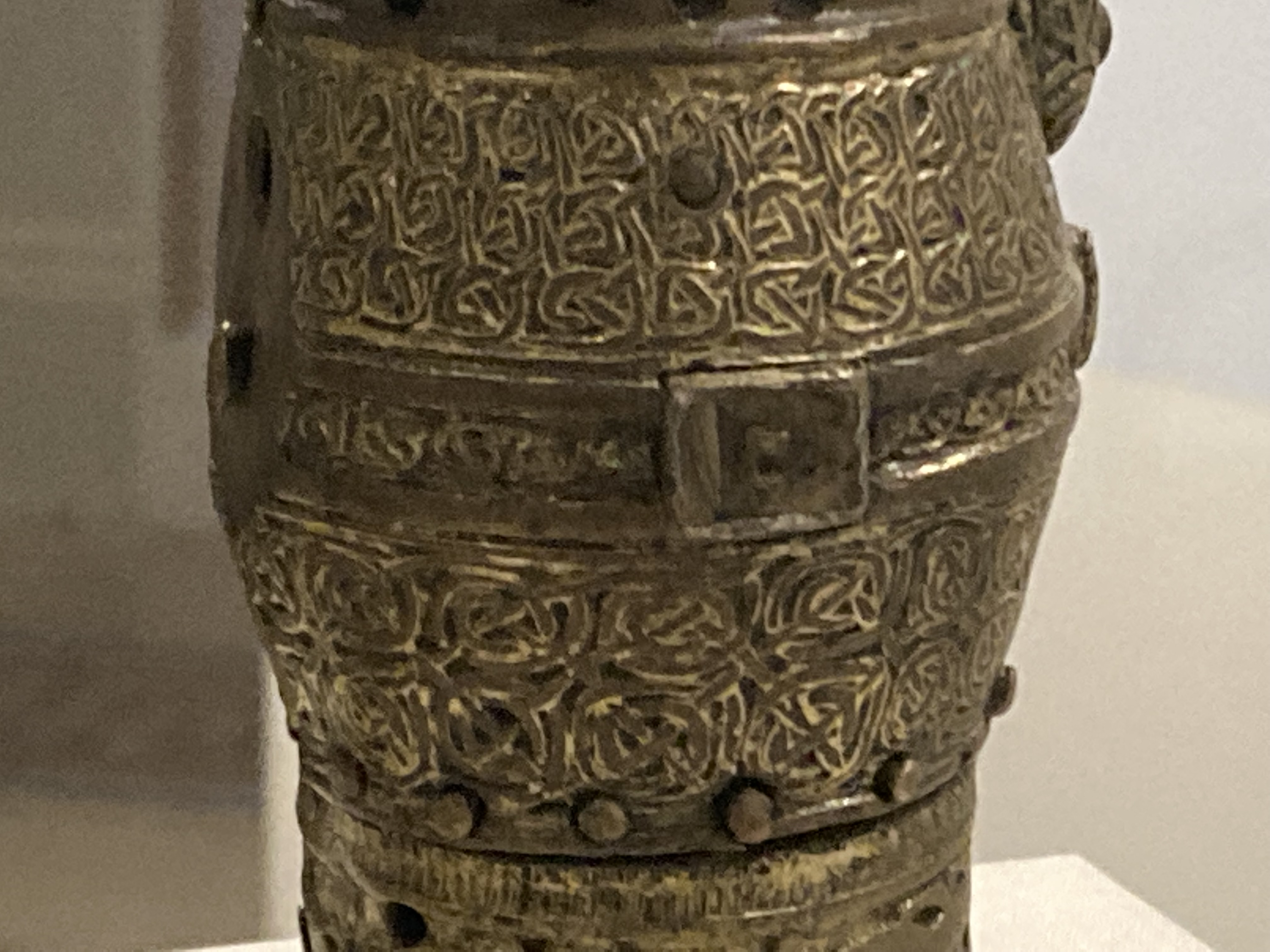
Upper knop from St. Columba’s Crozier

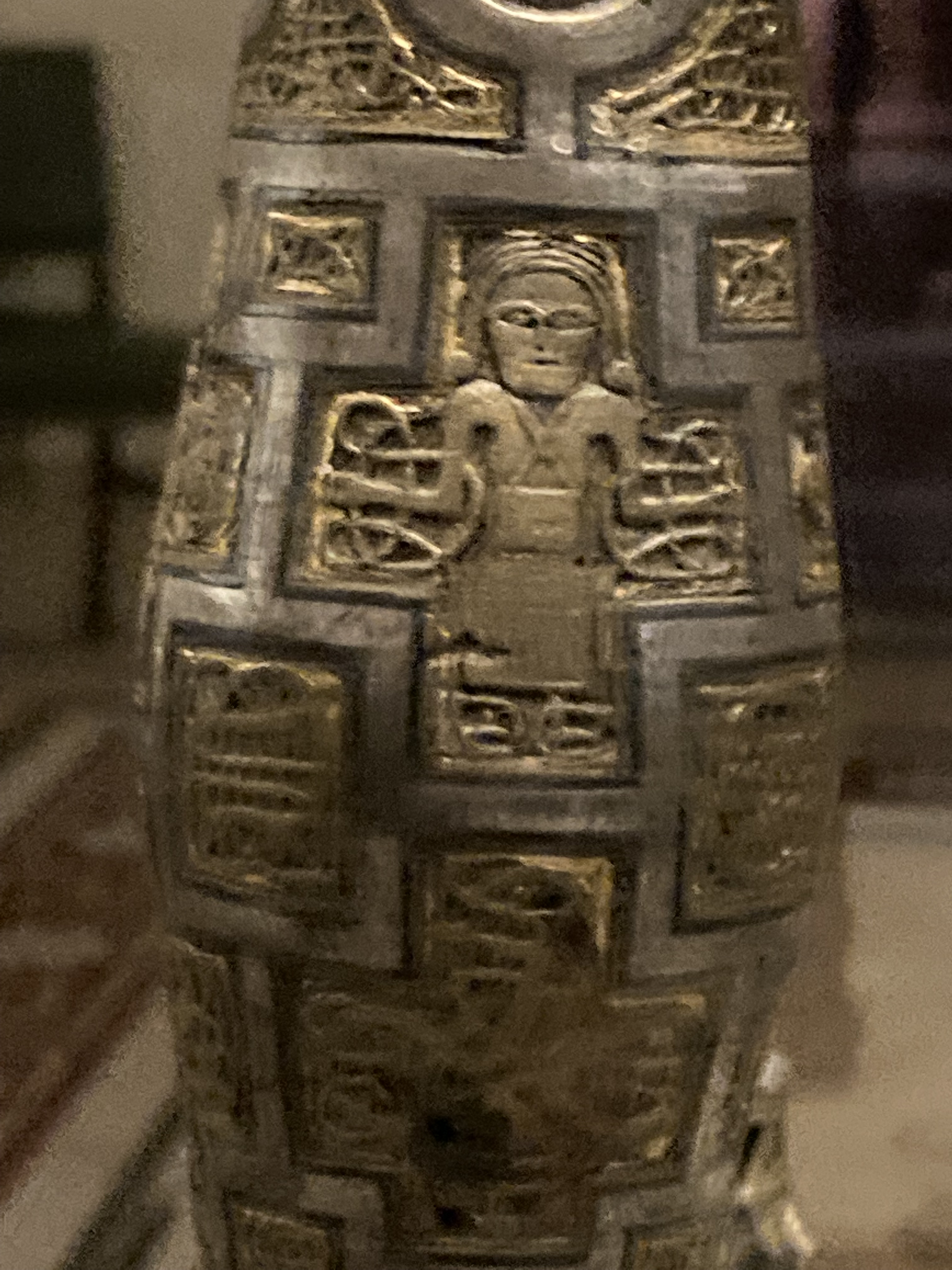
Lismore Crozier, middle knop

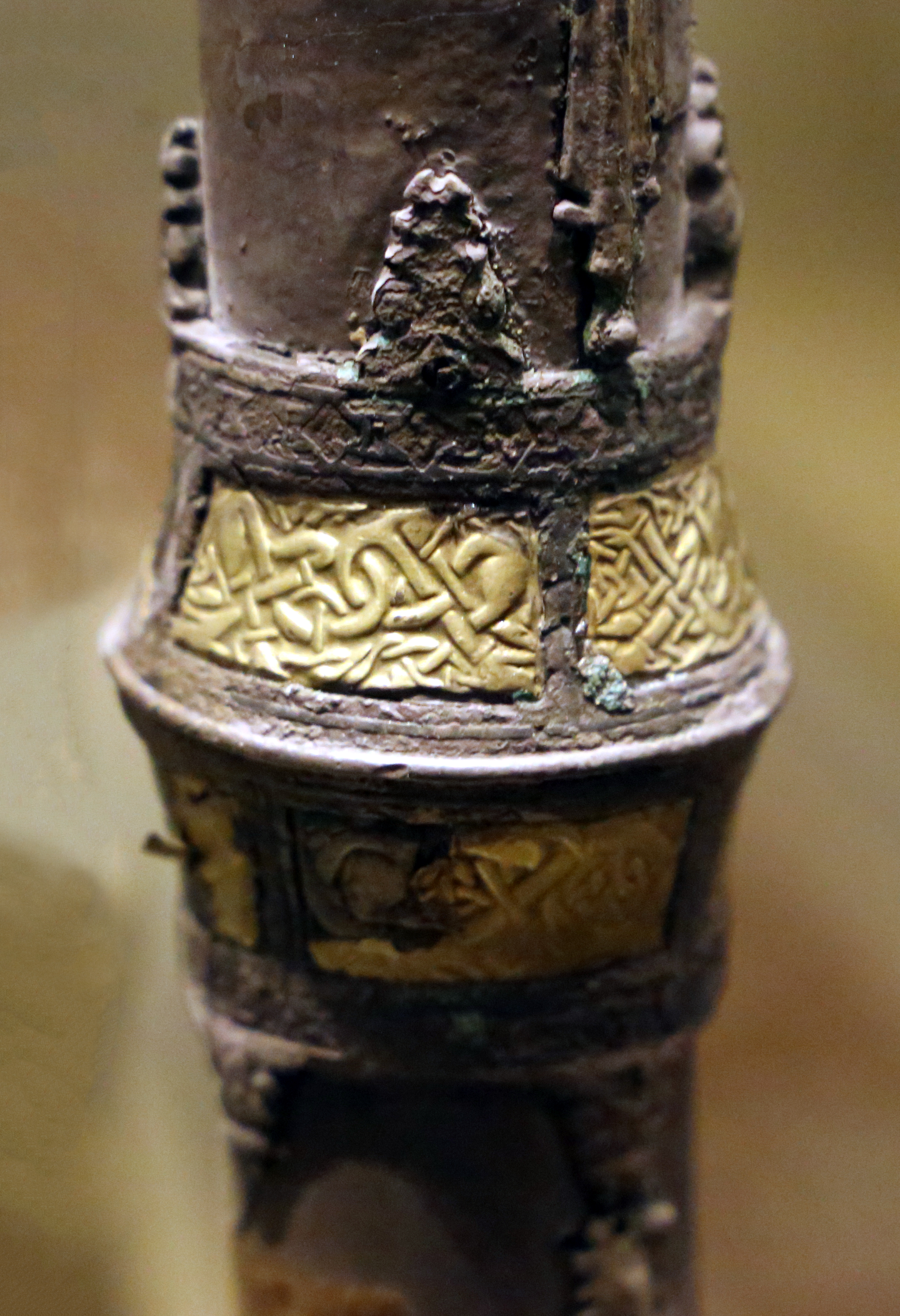
River Laune Crozier, middle knop

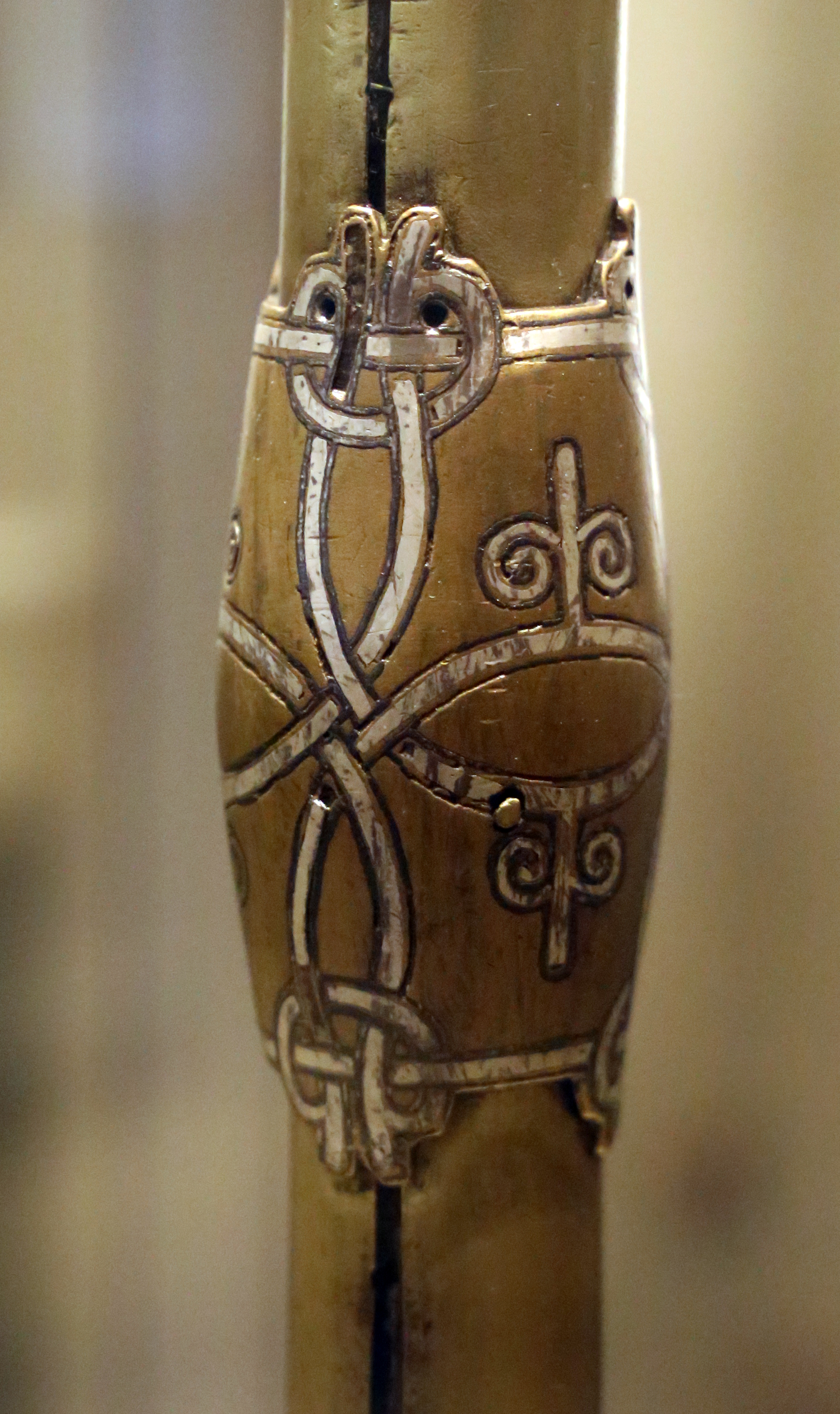
Clonmacnoise Crozier, middle knop

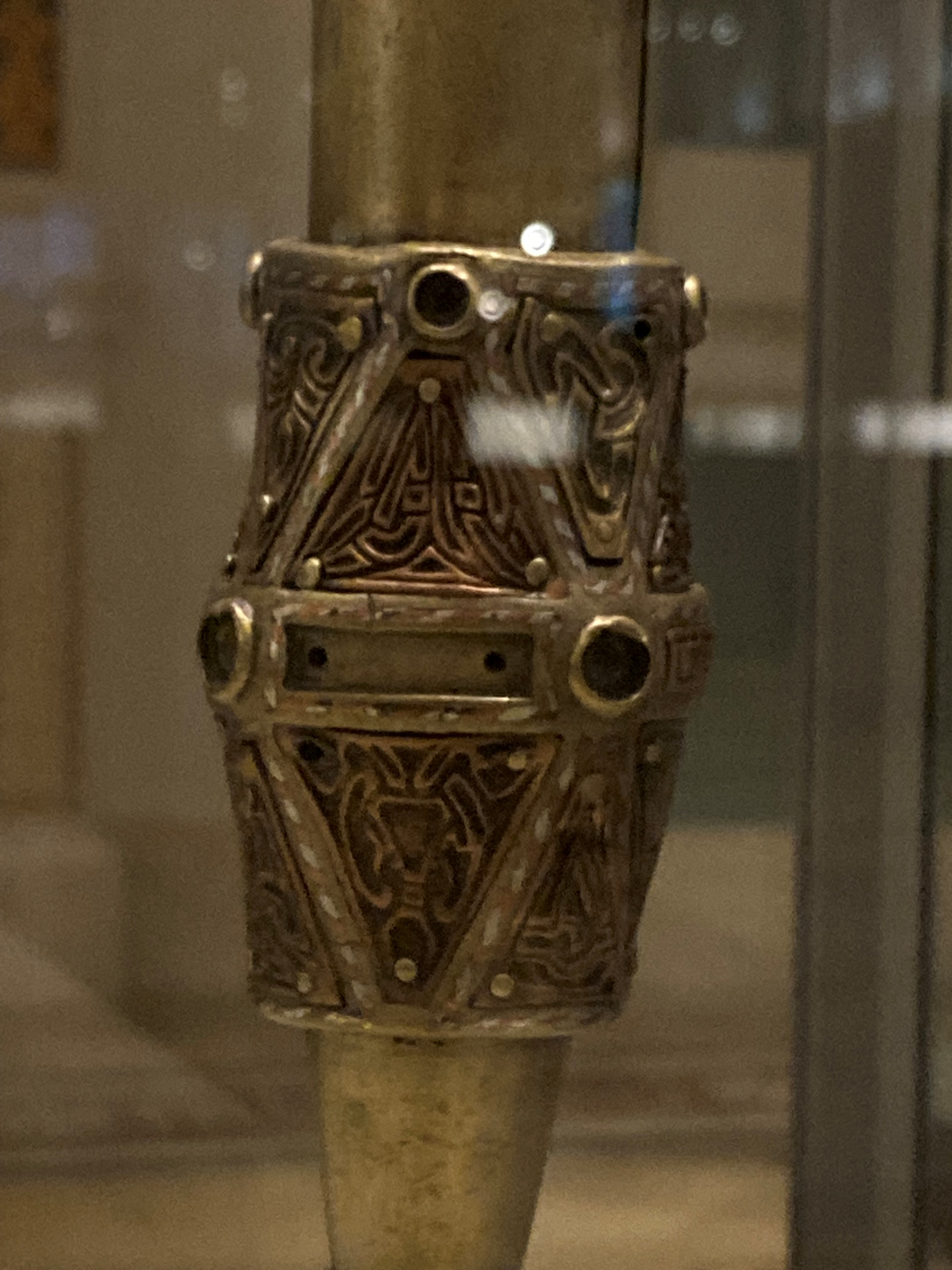
Clonmacnoise Crozier, lower knop

== Surviving examples ==
Like many Irish medieval religious objects, particularly shrines, some of the croziers (Irish language: bachall) were built in single phases, while others were first built in the 9th century and added to or reworked across the 10th and 11th centuries. Many of the croziers were held over the centuries by hereditary keepers, usually generations of a local family, until re-discovered by antiquarians in the early 19th century.

The art historian Griffith Murray estimates that there is "physical evidence for at least thirty-one Insular-type crosiers from Ireland", and around 20 other fragments composed of shafts, knops and base (ferrule). In addition there are fragments of four eighth-century Insular crosiers in Scandinavia.

=== Irish ===
==== The Prosperous Crozier ====
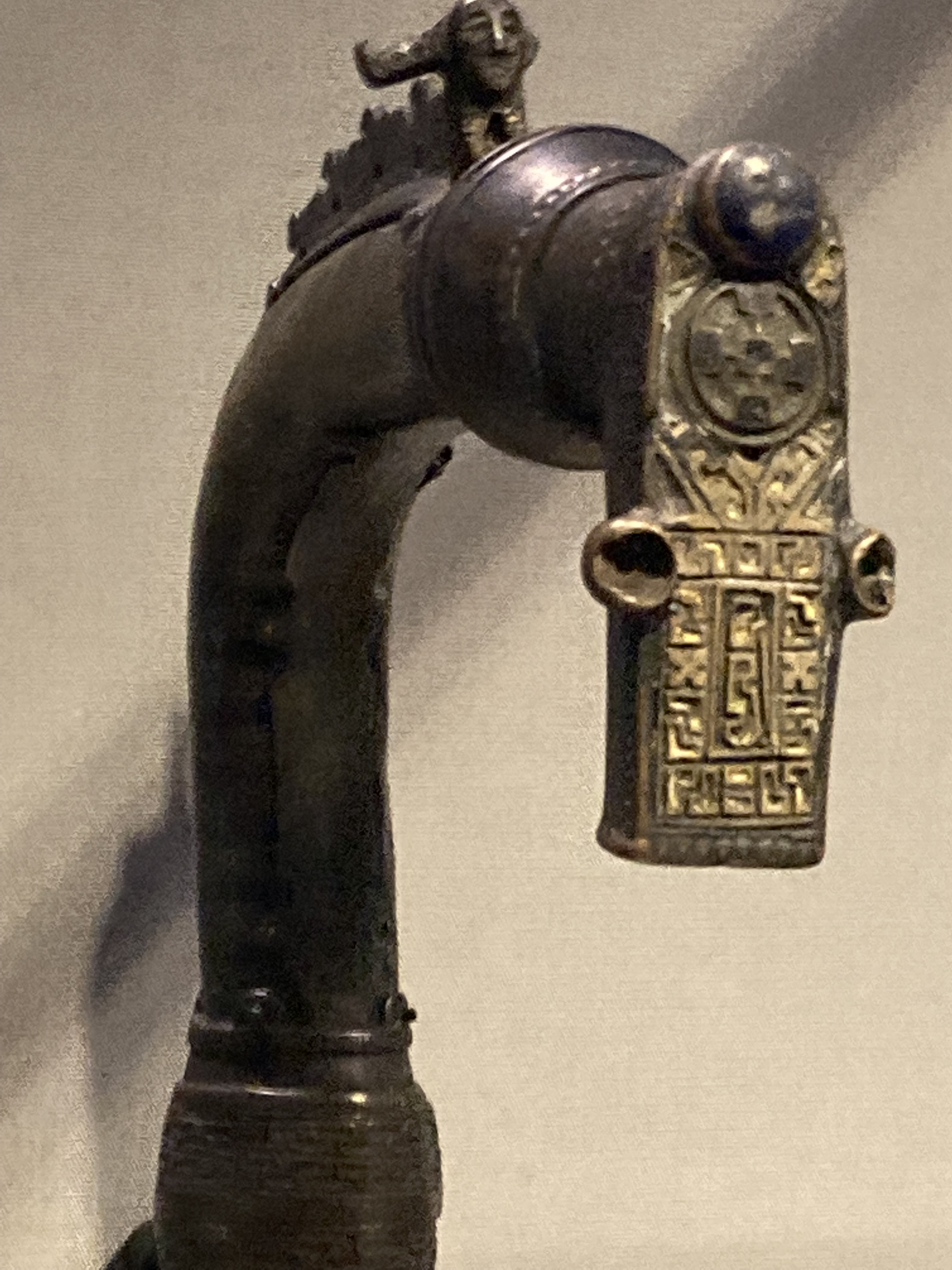
The Prosperous Crozier

This late 9th or early 10-century crozier was found fully intact by turf cutters in 1831 near Prosperous, County Kildare, but did not receive attention from antiquarians until 1851. It is made from copper, zinc, and tin alloy and contains traces of inscriptions, but they are too worn to read. The crozier is in relatively good condition but was split in half during the late Middle Ages and recombined in the nineteenth century. It is the longest intact example at a height of 1.34m. Its wooden core is supported by three tubular copper-alloy shaft casings, which hold four shaft knops, a ferrule and the crook. The drop is lined with decorations of glass and champlevé enamel. The drop contains a modern inscription, probably 18th or 19th century, recording that it was once owned by St. Mary's Abbey, Dublin, although there is no archival evidence to support this claim. The crest is decorated with profiles of birds at the top, and a human head at its lower end, just above the drop plate.

It is one of the earliest known European croziers and was extensively cleaned and refurbished in the late 20th century.

==== St. Columba’s Crozier ====
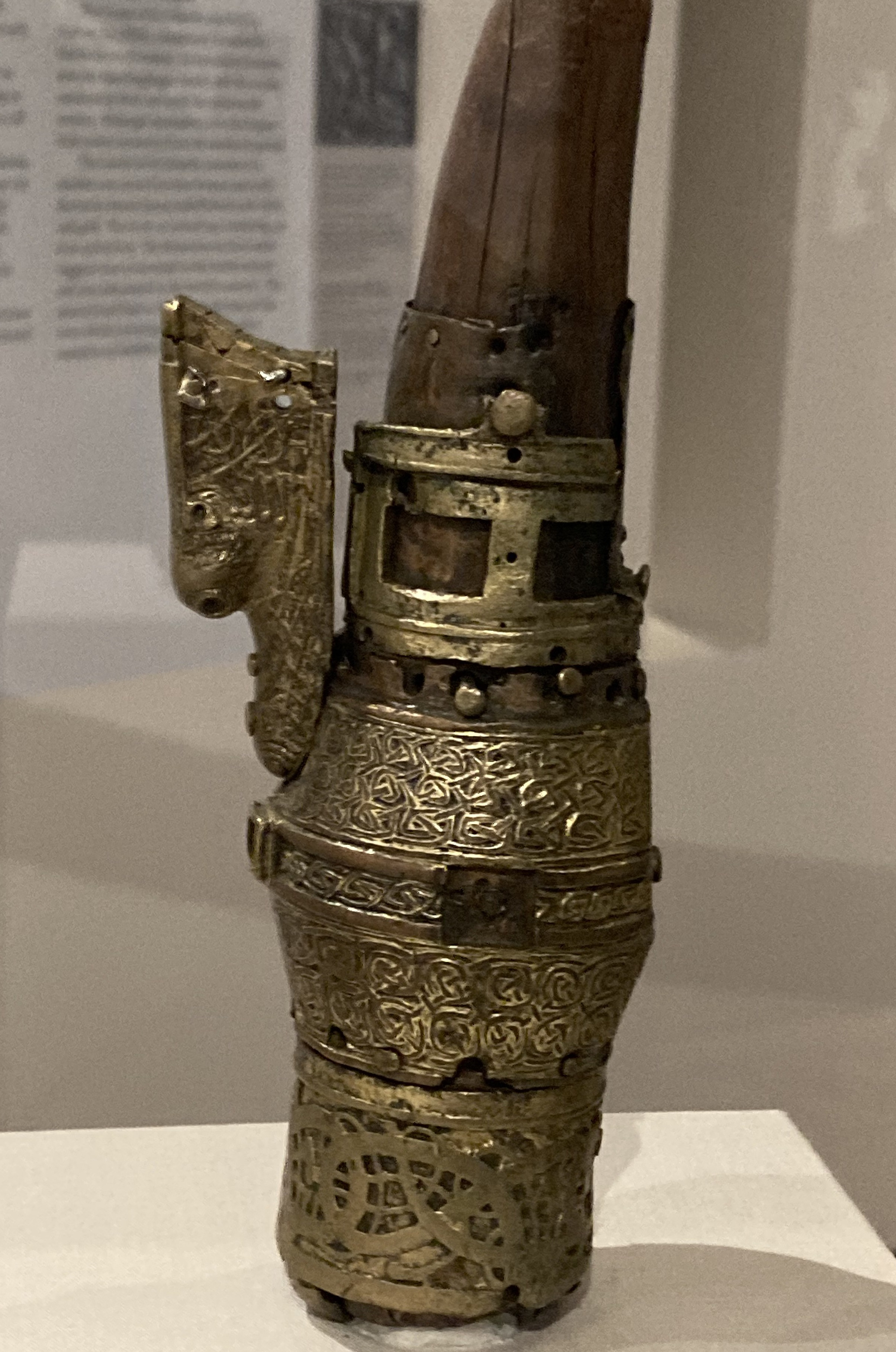
Knop from St. Columba’s Crozier, 9th and 11th centuries, NMI

The remains of the badly damaged and incomplete St. Columba’s (also known as St. Colmcille (d. 597)) Crozier consist of highly decorated four-foot wooden shaft, now broken in two, that is covered with sheet bronze tubes decorated with a bronze knope lined with silver and gilt. Its foot and crook are both missing. The staff originates from the ninth century and a number of (often poor and crude) refurbishments date from the 12th century onwards. It is associated with Durrow Abbey in County Meath, founded by Columba in the 6th century, and following the dissolution of the abbey, was kept by its hereditary keepers, the Mac Geoghegan family, until the mid-19th century, and was in the ownership of the Royal Irish Academy before 1850. Although considered to have once been one of the finest croziers, and a relic of one of Ireland's patron saints, it did not receive extensive scholarly examination until its inclusion in Column Burke's 1997 "Studies in the Cult of Saint Columba".

The barrel-shaped knope on the upper shaft is decorated with knotted interlace and holds now-empty settings that once contained studs, most likely of amber. Although this section is the earliest metalwork component, it was later filed down to accommodate both later embellishments and repair work. Later additions include the remnants of a downwards-facing animal head on the crest positioned as a protruding wing from the main shaft.

==== Kells Crozier ====
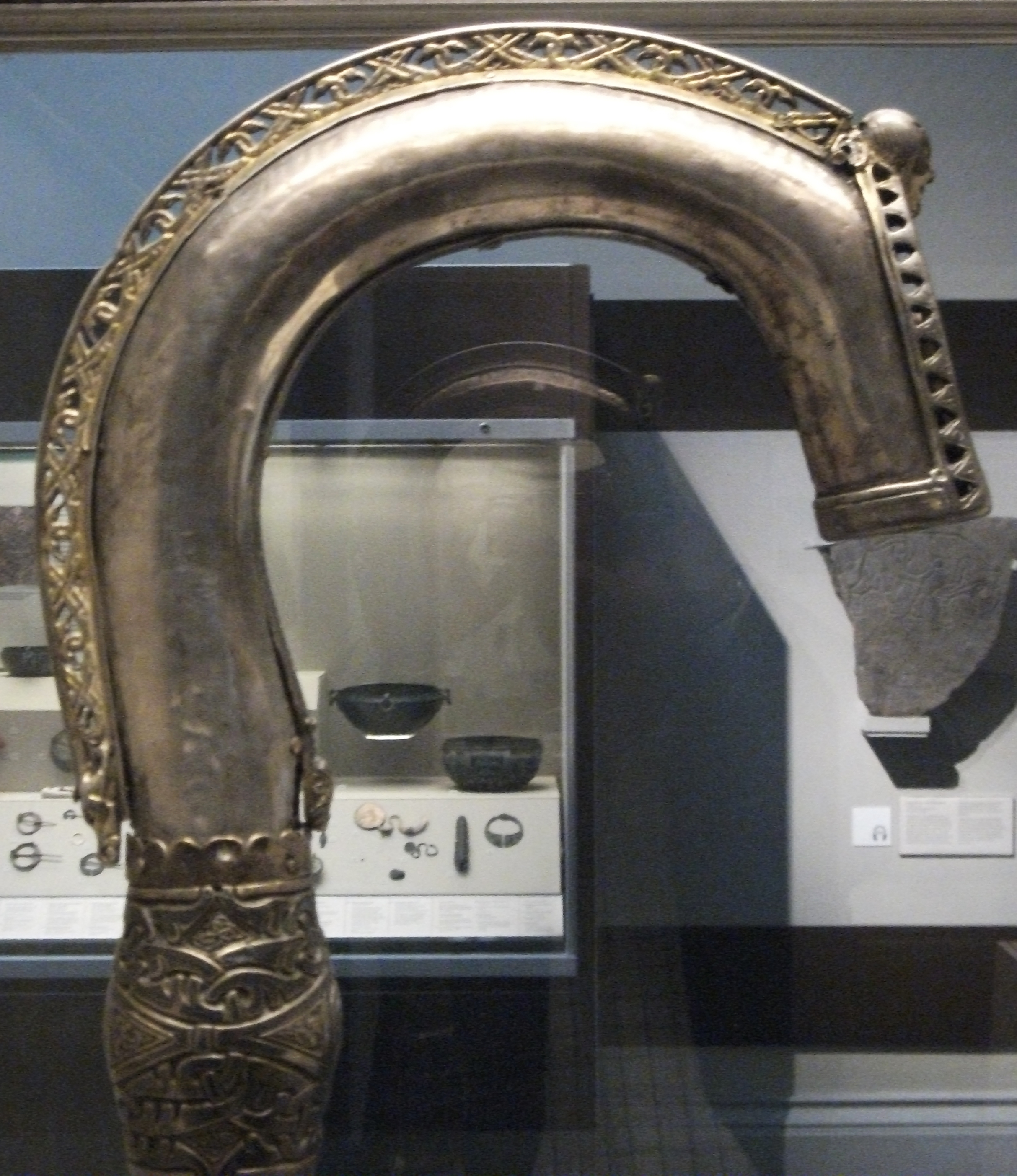
Crook and drop of the Kells Crozier, 10th century, British Museum

Formed from copper-alloy, silver, gilding and niello, the Kells Crozier was built in three phases. The earliest metalwork occurred during the late 9th or early 10 century, with further adornment occurring during the early 11th and early 12th centuries. The wooden core represents the first phase, and copper lined tubing, four closing strips, three copper alloy knopes, the crook, openwork crest and zoomorphic ornamentation. Later embellishments include the silver plates lining the crook, the drop (10th century), and the semi-precious stones (since lost) and niello-inlaid spirals influenced by the Ringerike style added in the 11th century.

The Kells Crozier, at 133 cm, is unusually long, however some of this is due to later additions. The art historian Rachel Moss suggests that because so many parts were replaced, the crozier may "have suffered 'profanation' (sárugud), which is sometimes reported of insignia."

Rediscovered in London in 1851, it is associated with Kells, County Meath based on inscriptions under the crest on the crook (ordo conduilis ocius do mel finnen), which, roughly translated, asks for prayers for Cúduilig (or Cū Duilig) and Maelfinnén (or Máel Finnén). However, as neither have been conclusively associated with historical figures, there is some doubt as to the location of origin. It is in the collection of the British Museum.

==== St. Mel's Crozier ====
Found in the mid-19th century on the grounds of an early medieval church in Ardagh, County Longford, Saint Mel's Crozier dates from the 10th or 11th centuries. The shaft is 84 cm long. The crook is made from oak, while the drop has a willow core. The drop's metal casting is secondary and has an inset (or cavity) to hold a reliquary box, which is now filled with a small block of wood. However the reliquary box is slightly too small for the drop, and was probably also a later addition, likely to replace a similar, slightly larger fitting.

The crozier is built from 14 separate metallic parts, with the wooden core lined with silver, gilding, glass and coral. Today, the wooden core can be divided into three parts, now lined with nail holes. The collar knope is designed to hold eight decorative stones, of which three survive: two red coral and one blue glass stone. The staff contains a number of secondary nail holes, indicating that it may have been "dismantled and repaired several times in the past". St. Mel's Crozier is dated based on the style of the zoomorphic designs, which are similar to those on the Kells Crozier.

While well preserved (a number of the plates were damaged, and its last major cleaning and refurbishment was carried out between 1971 and 1972) and studied to that point, the crozier was "almost entirely destroyed" in 2009 when St Mel's Cathedral was decimated in a fire. In the aftermath, over 200 recovered objects, including stained glass windows by Harry Clarke and St. Mel's Crozier, were taken to the National Museum of Ireland for assessment and restoration, although such was the extent of devastation that many were "beyond help".

==== River Laune Crozier ====
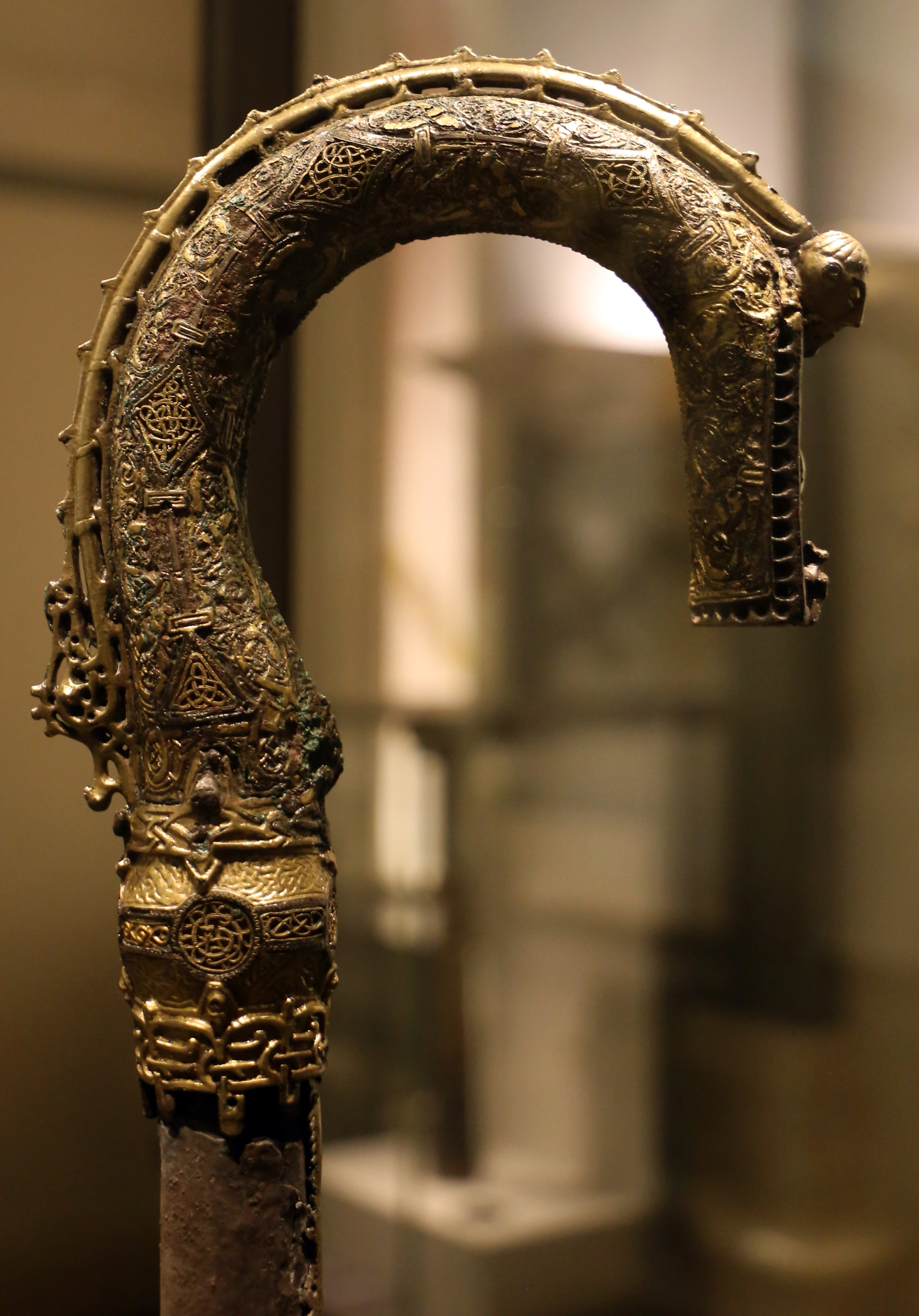
View of the River Laune Crozier, showing the row of tightly bound zoomorphic and interlace snakes, depicted in the ribbon-like 10th century Ringerike style.

Although somewhat corroded in parts, the River Laune Crozier (or Innisfallen) is fully intact and considered one of the finest surviving Irish examples, alongside those found at Clonmacnoise and Lismore. It was discovered in 1867 deposited in the bed of the Launein the River Laune, one of the Lakes of Killarney in County Kerry by a fisherman who initially mistook it as either a salmon or a gun, before establishing it as a "curious handstick." It was first exhibited at the Victoria and Albert Museum (then the South Kensington Museum) in 1869, on loan from Dr John Coffey, Bishop of Kerry.

It is dated to the late 11th century and is not thought to have been reworked. Its origin is uncertain; it is likely to have been made at Aghadoe Cathedral (e. 939 AD by Finian Lobhar (St. Finian the Leper)), but was held on the nearby abbey on Innisfallen ("Faithlinn's island"). The art historian Griffin Murray describes it as "probably broadly contemporary with the earliest stone church on the island and obviously relates a period of wealth and investment in the monastery at the time. It was of great significance to the community, as...the staff of office of the abbot and handed on from one abbot to the next. It symbolised the power of the founding saint of the monastery, St Finian, and by association the power of the abbot and the monastery itself,"

The River Laune Crozier is of especially fine workmanship and unusual in that its metalwork is mostly of silver rather than the more typical copper alloy. Four panels contain elaborate gilded filigree. It is 111.5 cm in length, while the hook is 17 cm wide. The crook is from a single casting, onto which the drop-plate and openwork crest were attached. The crest panels contain both zoomorphic and abstract patterns and are bordered by bands of niello with inlaid with gilt wire.

==== Lismore Crozier ====
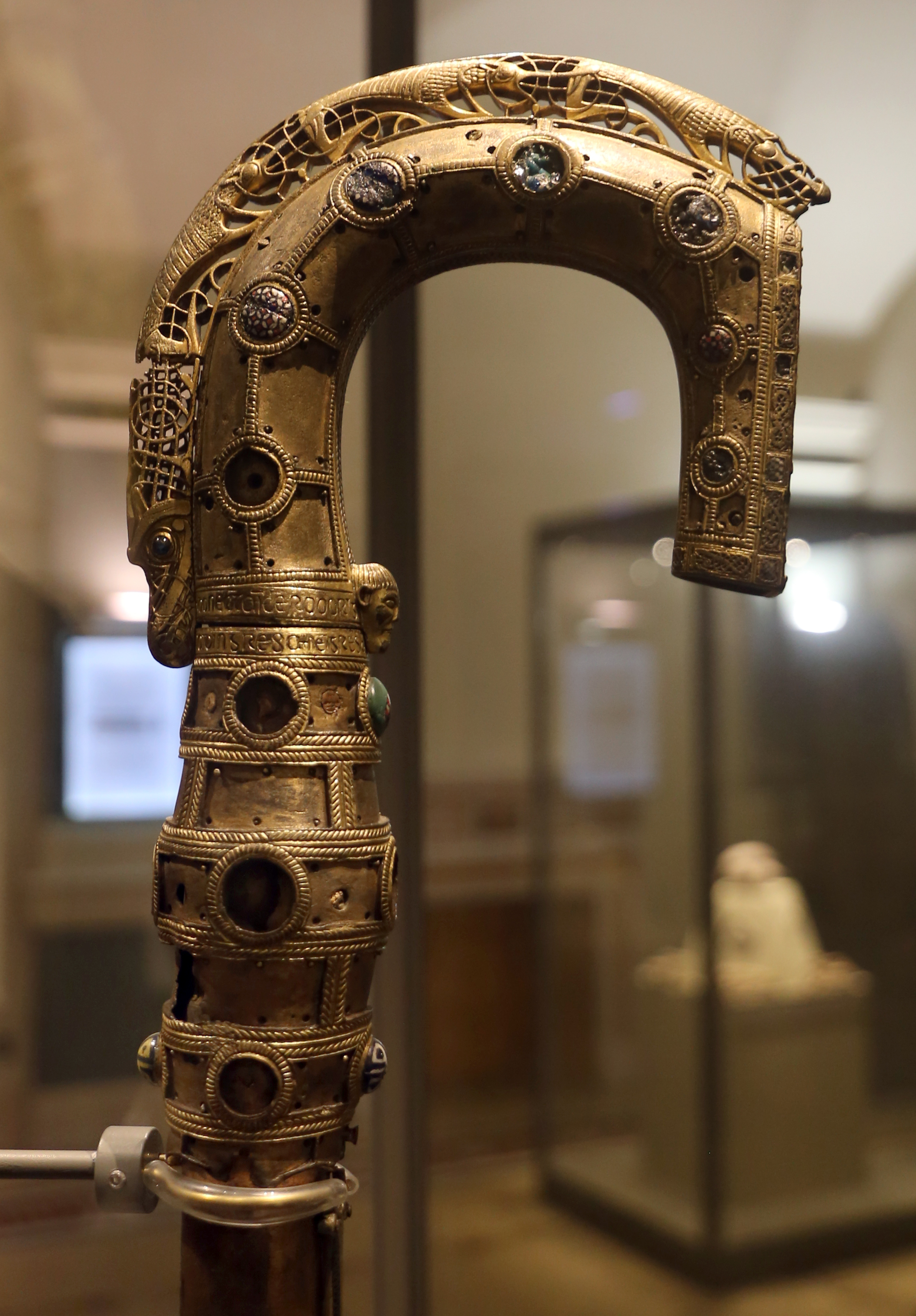
The Lismore Crozier, c. 1100, NMI

The Lismore crozier is dated to 1100 AD and was rediscovered, along with the 15th-century Book of Lismore, in a blocked doorway in Lismore Castle in 1814. It is 115 cm high and built from wood, silver, gold, niello and glass. It is almost fully intact and in good condition with little modern reworking. Its crest contains a procession of animals that continues to a head at the end of the crook. The crook has three small, probably secondary (i.e. added later) reliquaries located in the animal heads and in the drop. The crook is further decorated on both sides with blue glass studs set in set in gold collars, and holding white and red millefiori glass insets. It is now in the collection of the NMI.

Inscriptions on the metalwork record that it was produced by "Nechtain the craftsman" and commissioned by Niall mac Meic Aeducain, a bishop of Lismore who died in 1113. The inscription read "OR DON IAL MC MEICC AEDUCAIN LASAN[D]ERNAD I GRESA" ("Pray for Nial Mc Meicc Aeducain for whom this was made"), and OR DO NECTAICERD DO RIGNE I GRESA" ("Pray for Nechtain, craftsman, who made this object"). Nechtain placed the inscriptions in a very narrow space and so had to use abbreviations, and in some instances omitted a letter (for example "Niall" is spelled with only one "l", and the central "d" is missing from "Lasandernad").

During a 1966 refurbishment, two small relics and a linen cloth were found inside the crook.

==== Clonmacnoise Crozier ====
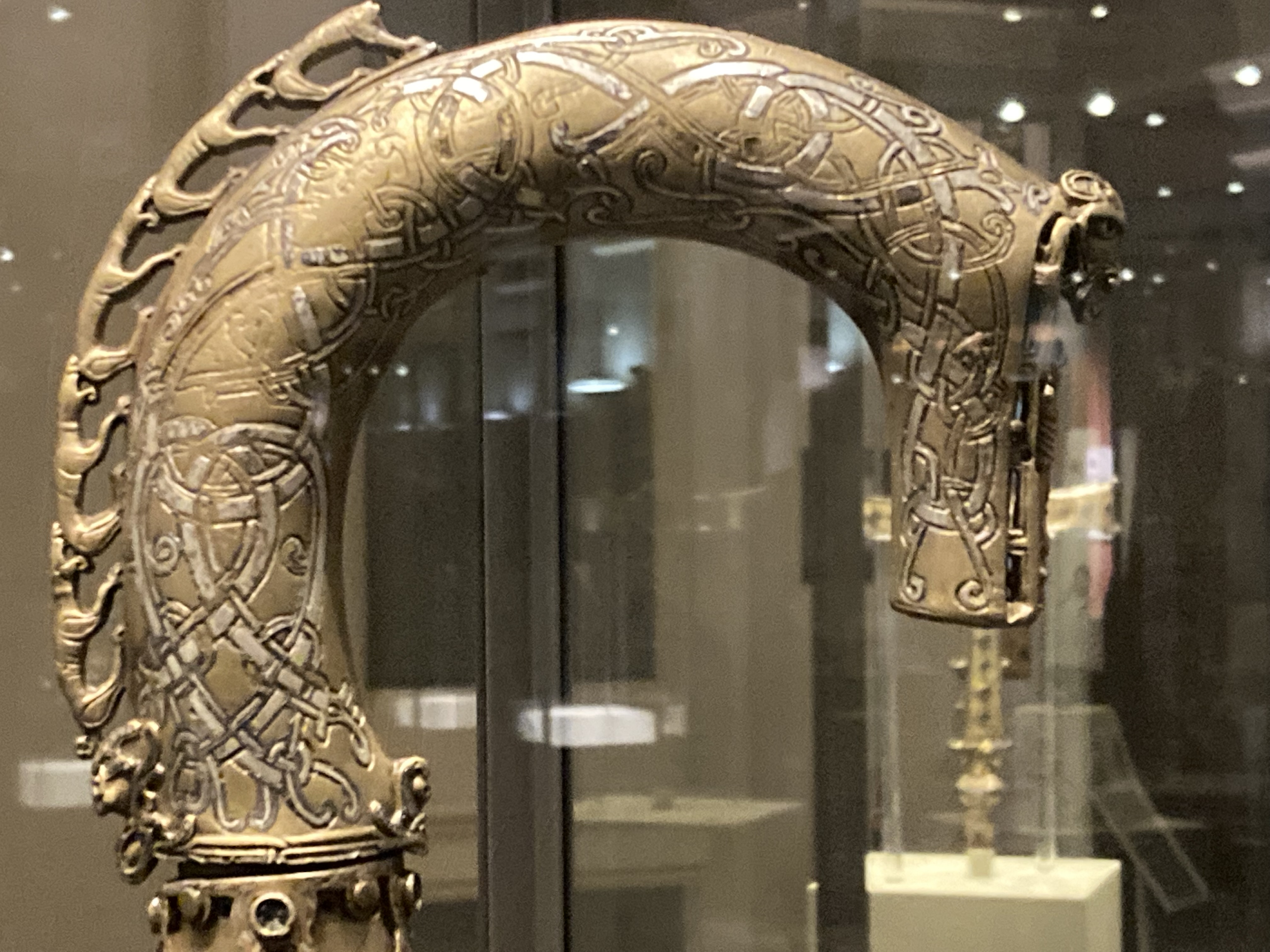
The Clonmacnoise Crozier, late 11th century, NMI

The Clonmacnoise Crozieris is often described as the finest of the surviving examples in both craftmanship and design. Thought to be associated with Saint Ciarán, it is dated to the late 11th century. It is 97 cm long, and is formed from wood, copper-alloy, silver, niello, glass and enamel. The crozier is 13.5 cm high and 15.5 cm wide, and decorated with round blue glass studs and white and red millefiori insets. Snake-like animals are arranged in interlocked rows along the sides, and there are large animal heads in high relief at either side of the base of the crook. The openwork crest was cast and contains a row of five crouched dog-like animals. The zoomorphic and interlace patterns are in the Irish Ringerike style and bear a strong resemblance to late 11th century additions to the Bearnan Chulain bell shrine, and the early 12th century Shrine of Saint Lachtin's Arm, suggesting a possible origination in Dublin.

The shaft has three richly decorated knopes, the largest of which contains a crest and measures 7.5 cm. The collar below the upper knope is made of copper alloy and contains relief designs of two large cat-like animals facing each other. The central knope is less decorated compared to the other two but has inlay bands and silver lining. The lower knope contains decorations, including blue glass studs. The monastery at Clonmacnoise is also the location where the 8th century Stowe Missal and 10th or 11th century Clonmacnoise Crucifixion Plaque were discovered.

=== Scottish ===
While a number of Scottish Insular croziers ("quigrichs") survive, there are only six extant early Christian examples (the Bachall Mór fragment, the crosier of St Fillan, two drops found at Hoddom, Dumfriesshire, and two unidentified drops now in the British Museum. Their likeness to Irish examples is indicative of the close contact between Scottish and Irish craftsmen, and it is known that a number of Irish metalworkers settled in Scotland. The similarities include methods of construction and their style and decoration. The Scottish croziers are characterised by their angular crook shape with separate (attached) drops, with most dated to before the mid-11th century. The designs and patterns on the crooks are typical of the Irish or West Highland type.

==== St. Fillan's Crozier and the Coigreach ====
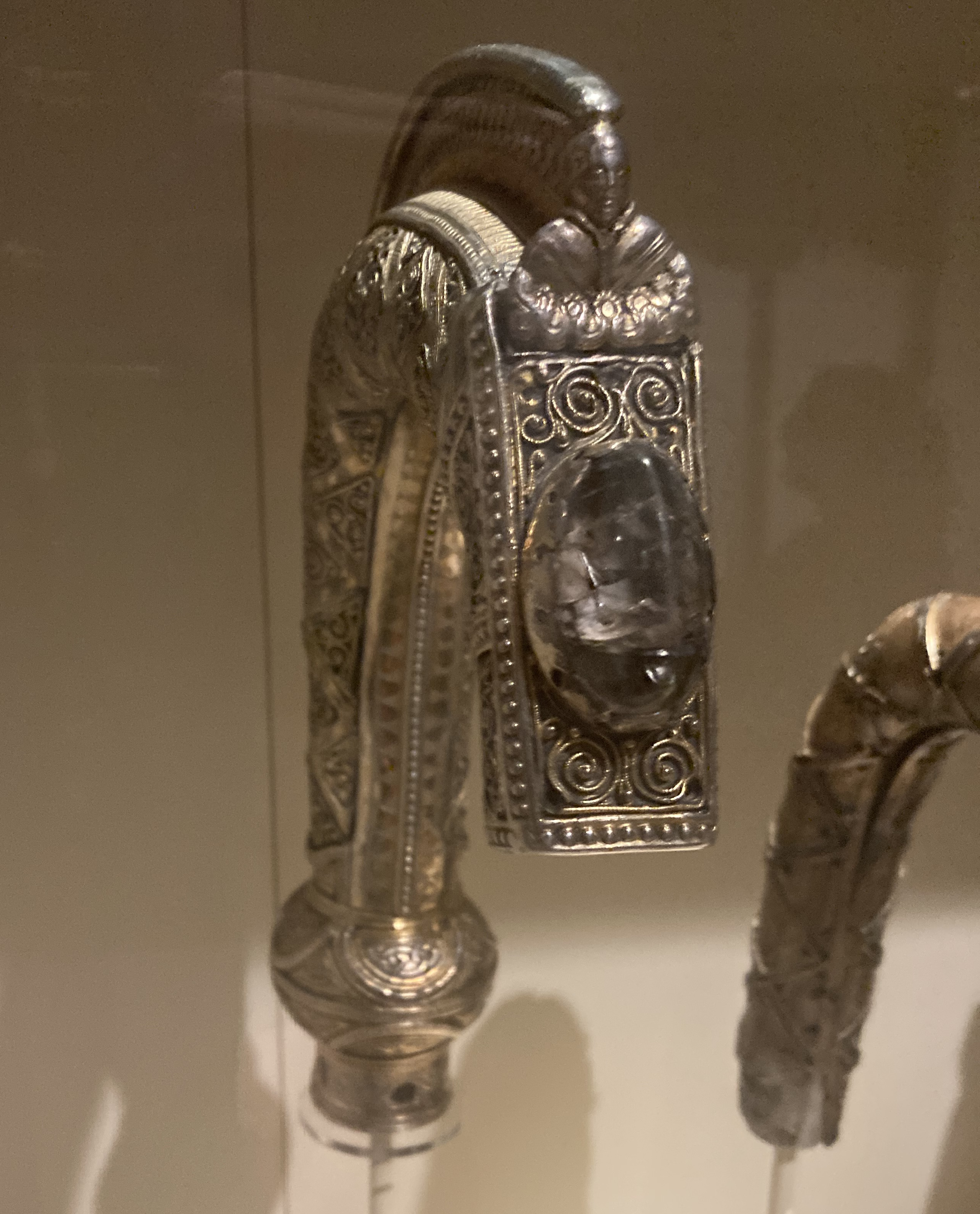
The drop of St Fillan’s Crozier, National Museum of Scotland

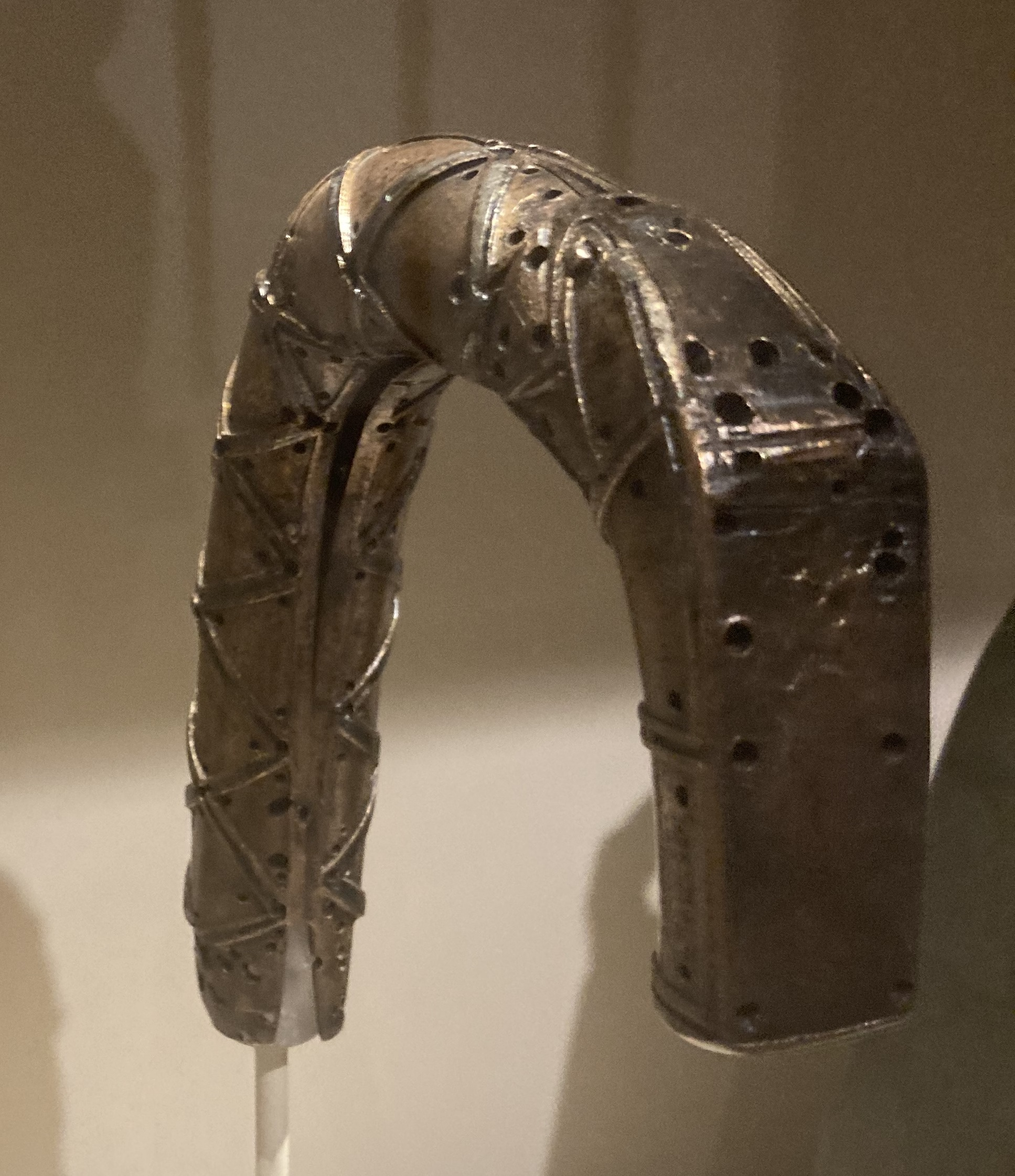
The Coigreach, National Museum of Scotland

St. Fillan's Crozier dates from the 8th century, with additions in the Romanesque period. It is s traditionally associated with the Irish monk St. Fillan (Gaelic: Fáelán or "little wolf"), who lived in the eighth century at Glendochart in Perthshire, central Scotland. Only the crook survives; the staff was lost at an unknown date. Sometime around the late 13th century the crook was encased in the Coigreach (or Quigrich), a crosier-shrine of similar size and form built as a protective case for the crook, and made from silver, gold and rock crystal and dates from the late 13th century, with additions from the 14th or 15th centuries. The Coigreach was rediscovered in the mid-19th century by the archaeologist Daniel Wilson, who opened it and found St. Fillan’s Crozier inside.

The crozier was at first used for blessings and as a talisman or battle standard: it is recorded as having been brought onto the field at the Battle of Bannockburn in 1314. Later it was thought to be able to heal people and animals, and under the ownership of its hereditary keepers the Dewars of Glendochart, acted as a ceremonial object for oaths of loyalty and dispute settlement, mostly related to the recovery of stolen cattle.

Both St. Fillan’s and the Coigreach are in the collection of the National Museum of Scotland in Edinburgh, where they are displayed in the Kingdom of the Scots gallery and described as an "object-pair".

==== Others ====
The Bachall Mór (English: "Great Staff", sometimes known as "The Crozier of St Moluagh") dates from c. 730 and is in very poor condition having lost most of its metal casing and suffered damage to both its crook and ferrule. It remains in the possession of the Duke of Argyll, its hereditary keeper, on the Isle of Lismore, and is thus understudied.

Other well-preserved Scottish Insular croziers include the St. Donnan's crozier (Eigg), and the Kilvarie Bar-a-Goan (Kilmore, Skye). The Cath-Bhuaidh ("battle victory") found in Iona, is traditionally associated with St. Colmcille and thought to have been used as a talisman in a 918 battle between native picts and Viking invaders. In addition fragments have been found in Galloway, Loch Shiel and in a bishop's grave at Whithorn.

== Sources ==
- Bourke, Cormac; Hook, Duncan. "The Prosperous, Co. Kildare, Crozier: archaeology and use". Proceedings of the Royal Irish Academy: Archaeology, Culture, History, Literature, volume 117C, 2017
- Bourke, Cormac. "A Crozier and Bell from Inishmurray and Their Place in Ninth-Century Irish Archaeology". Proceedings of the Royal Irish Academy: Archaeology, Culture, History, Literature. Dublin: Royal Irish Academy, volume 85C, 1985. JSTOR 25506128
- O'Carroll, Ellen; Condit, Tom. "Ireland's Earliest Crozier?". Archaeology Ireland, volume 14, no. 2, Summer 2000. JSTOR 20558904
- Caldwell, D. H. (ed). Angels, Nobles and Unicorns: Art and Patronage in Medieval Scotland. Edinburgh: National Museums Scotland, 1982. ISBN 0950311715
- Ó Floinn, Raghnal; Wallace, Patrick (eds). Treasures of the National Museum of Ireland: Irish Antiquities. Dublin: National Museum of Ireland, 2002. ISBN 978-0-7171-2829-7
- Frazer, W. On an Irish Crozier, with Early Metal Crook, Probably the Missing "Crozier of St. Ciaran," of Clonmacnoise. Proceedings of the Royal Irish Academy, volume 1 1889–1891. JSTOR 20503841
- Henry, Françoise. "Around an Inscription: The Cross of the Scriptures at Clonmacnois". The Journal of the Royal Society of Antiquaries of Ireland, volume 110, 1980. JSTOR 25508773
- Kelly, Eamonn P. "Treasures of Ireland: Catalogue entries, Late Bronze Age and Iron Age Antiquities". Treasures of Ireland: Irish Art 3000 BC – 1500 AD. Dublin: Royal Irish Academy, 1983
- Lucas, Anthony. "The Social Role of Relics and Reliquaries in Ancient Ireland". The Journal of the Royal Society of Antiquaries of Ireland, volume 116, 1986. JSTOR 25508904
- MacDermott, Máire. "The Crosiers of St. Dympna and St. Mel and Tenth-Century Irish Metal-Work". Proceedings of the Royal Irish Academy: Archaeology, Culture, History, Literature, Volume 58, 1956. JSTOR 25505072
- McDonald, Ian. Clerics and Clansmen: The Diocese of Argyll Between the Twelfth and Sixteenth Centuries. Brill, 2013. ISBN 978-9-0041-8547-0
- Mitchell, Perette. "The Inscriptions on Pre-Norman Irish Reliquaries". Proceedings of the Royal Irish Academy: Archaeology, Culture, History, Literature, volume 96C, no. 1, 1996. JSTOR 25516156
- Moss, Rachel. Medieval c. 400—c. 1600: Art and Architecture of Ireland. London: Yale University Press, 2014. ISBN 978-0-3001-7919-4
- Murray, Griffin. "The history and provenance of two early medieval crosiers ascribed to Clonmacnoise Archived 18 August 2021 at the Wayback Machine". Dublin: Proceedings of the Royal Irish Academy: Archaeology, Culture, History, Literature, 2021
- Murray, Griffin. "The Medieval Treasures of County Kerry".Tralee: Kerry County Museum, 2010. ISBN 978-0-956-5714-0-3
- Murray, Griffin. "The provenance of the county Antrim crozier". Ulster Journal of Archaeology, Third Series, volume 67, 2008. JSTOR 41220771
- Murray, Griffin. "Insular-type crosiers: their construction and characteristics". Making and Meaning in Insular Art: Proceedings of the Fifth International Conference on Insular Art, 2007 (a)
- Murray, Griffin. "Joseph Cooper Walkers Account of the Discovery of the Cashel". The Journal of the Royal Society of Antiquaries of Ireland, volume 137, 2007 (b). JSTOR 23024265
- Murray, Griffin. "The 'Hidden Power' of the Irish Crosier". Archaeology Ireland, volume 18, No. 1, Spring 2004. JSTOR 20562731
- Oddy, W. A.; McIntyre, I. M. "St. Mel's Crozier: Technical Examination and Report on Conservation and Restoration in 1971-2". The Journal of the Royal Society of Antiquaries of Ireland, volume 103, 1973. JSTOR 25508613
- Mitchell, Perette. "The Inscriptions on Pre-Norman Irish Reliquaries". Proceedings of the Royal Irish Academy: Archaeology, Culture, History, Literature, volume 96C, no. 1, 1996. JSTOR 25516156
- Michelli, Perette. "Four Scottish crosiers and their relation to the Irish tradition". Proceedings of the Society of Antiquaries of Scotland, 118, 1986
- Michelli, Perette. "Fragments of a fifth crosier from Scotland". Proceedings of the Society of Antiquaries of Scotland, 116, 1988
- Stokes, Margaret. Early Christian Art in Ireland, Part 1. London: Chapman and Hall, 1887
- Stokes, William. The Life and Labours in Art and Archaeology of George Petrie. Cambridge: Cambridge University Press, 1868. ISBN 978-1-1080-7570-1
- Stuart, John. "Historical Notices of St. Fillan's Crozier, and of the Devotion of King Robert Bruce to St. Fillan". Proceedings of the Society of Antiquaries of Scotland, volume XII, 1876
- Young, Susan. The Work of Angels. Masterpieces of Celtic Metalwork, 6th—9th Centuries AD. London: British Museum, 1989. ISBN 978-02927-9058-2
