= St. Columba's Crozier =

Irish archaeological fragment

St. Columba's Crosier
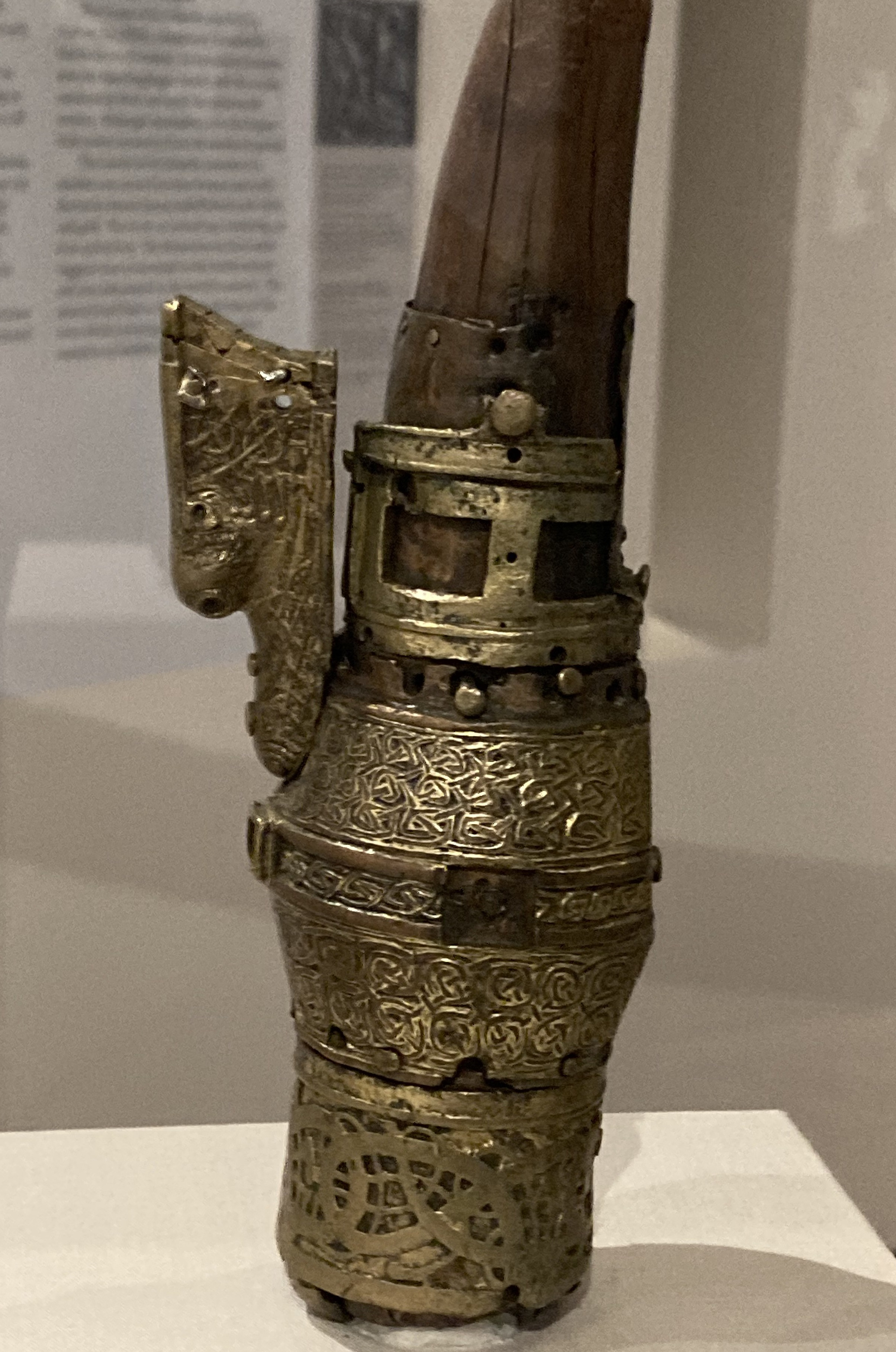
- Staff of St. Columba's Crozier
- Material: wood, bronze, gold, amber
- Created: 8th or 9th century
- Present location: National Museum of Ireland, Kildare Street, Dublin

St. Columba's Crozer (or the Cathach of Colum Cille) is a fragment of an 8th or 9th century Irish Insular crozier fragment. It consists of a wooden core covered by sheet bronze tubes decorated with a bronze knope lined with silver and gilt. The wooden shaft measures four feet and is elaborately decorated but incomplete: it was found broken in two, and both its foot and crook are missing.

Built for St. Columba's (also known as St. Colmcille (d. 597)), the fragment is held at the National Museum of Ireland, Kildare Street, Dublin, but is not usually on display.

== Provenance ==
The staff originates from the 9th-century, while a number of often poor and crude refurbishments date from the 12th century and later. It is one of the saint's three well-known relics, the others being his bell-shrine and the well-known 9th century Cathach of St. Columba which was built to contain a 6th century Insular psalter once thought to have been written by Columba himself.

It is associated with Durrow Abbey in County Meath, which was founded by Columba in the 6th century. Following the abbey's dissolution, it was kept by its hereditary keepers, the Mac Geoghegan family, until the mid-19th century. The staff was in the ownership of the Royal Irish Academy before 1850. Although considered to have once been one of the finest croziers, and a relic of one of Ireland's patron saints, it did not receive substantial scholarly examination until its inclusion in Column Burke's 1997 "Studies in the Cult of Saint Columba".

== Description ==
The barrel-shaped knope on the upper shaft is decorated with knotted interlace, and holds now-empty settings that once contained studs, most likely of amber. Although this section is the earliest metalwork component, it was later filed down to accommodate both later embellishments and repair work. Later additions include the remnants of a downwards-facing animal head on the crest, positioned as a protruding wing from the main shaft.

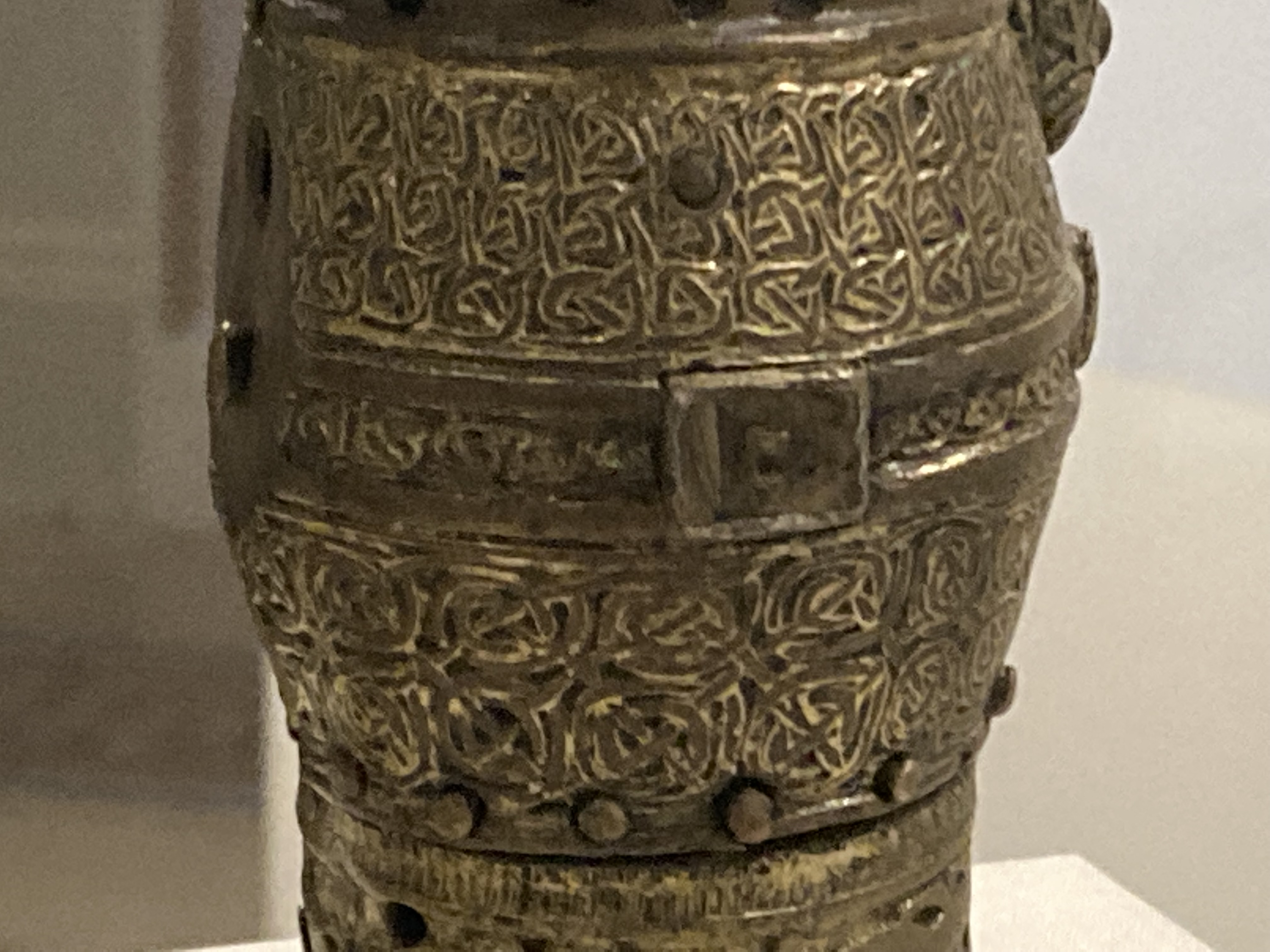
Detail of the knope

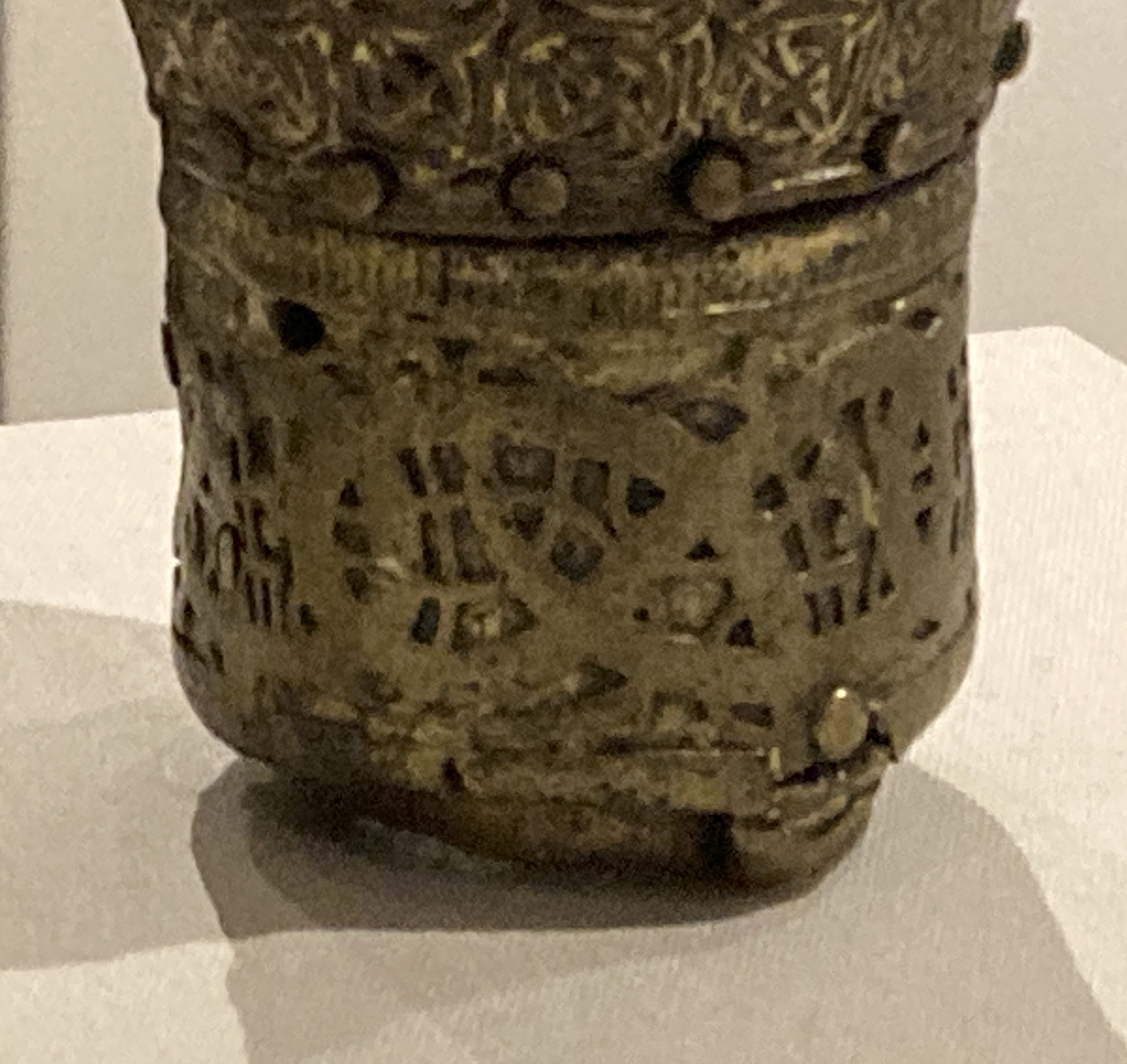
Detail of panel below the knope

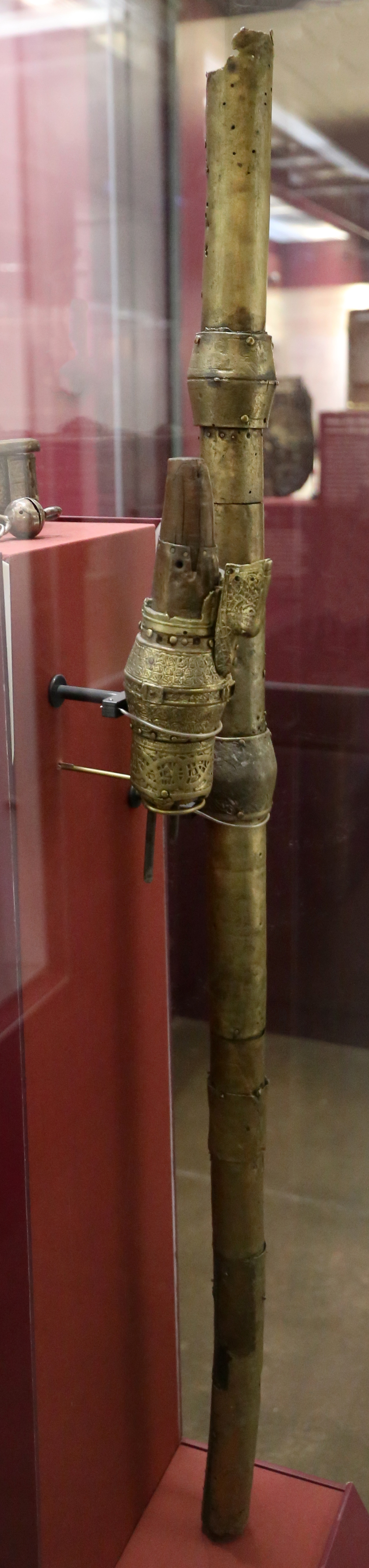
The fragments placed together

== Sources ==
- Bourke, Colm. Studies in the cult of Saint Columba. Dublin: Four Courts Press, 1997. ISBN 978-1-8518-2313-0
- Moss, Rachel. Medieval c. 400—c. 1600: Art and Architecture of Ireland. London: Yale University Press, 2014. ISBN 978-0-3001-7919-4
- Murray, Griffin. "Insular-type crosiers: their construction and characteristics". Making and Meaning in Insular Art: Proceedings of the Fifth International Conference on Insular Art, 2007
