= Prosperous Crozier =

9th or 10-century Irish crozier

The Prosperous Crozier
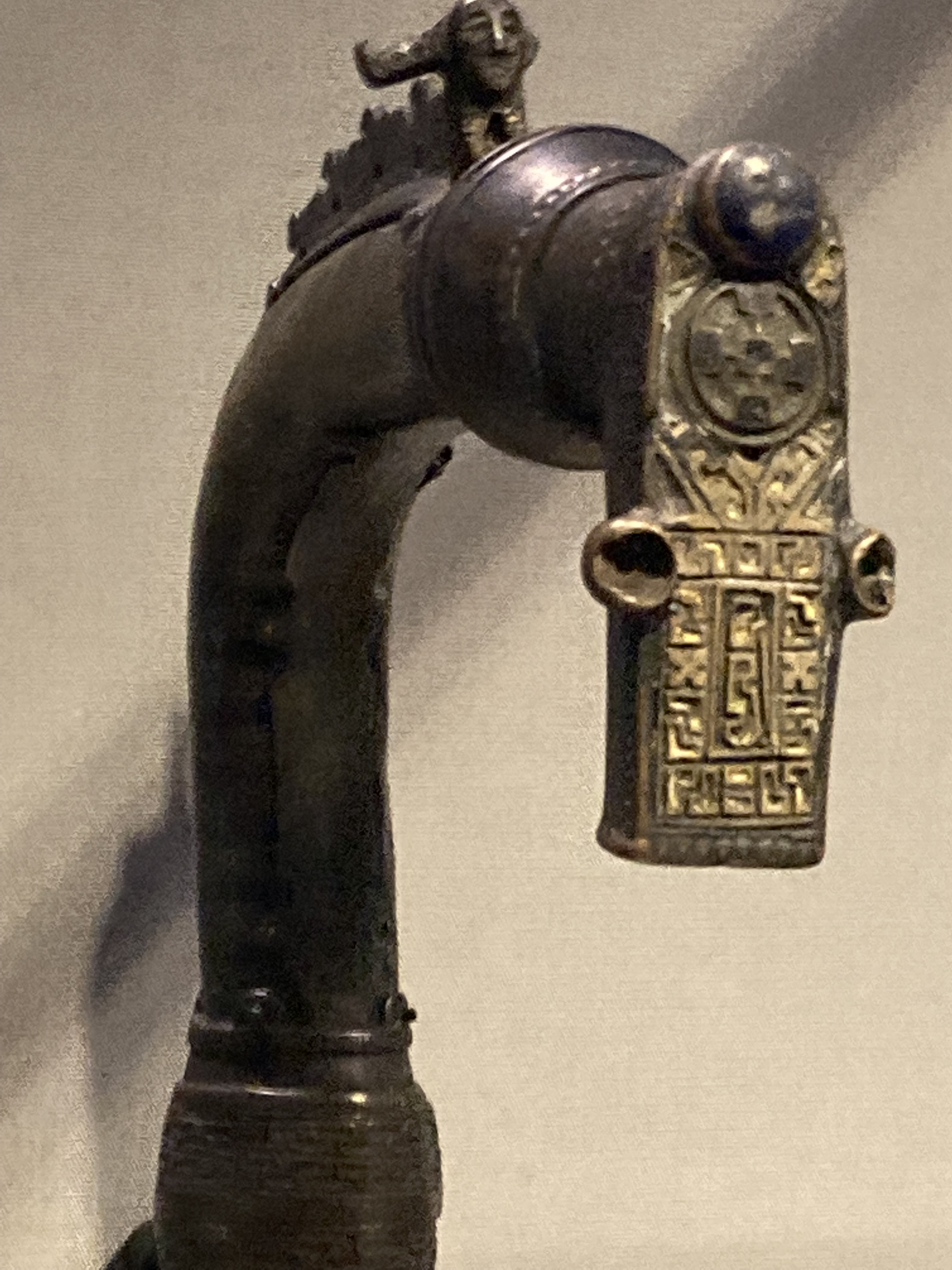
- The crozier's crook (head) and drop plate
- Material: yew wood, bronze, zinc, tin-alloy, enamel
- Size: Height: 134 cm (53 in)
- Created: Late 9th or early 10-century
- Discovered: c. 1831; Prosperous, County Kildare, Ireland
- Present location: National Museum of Ireland, Kildare Street, Dublin

The Prosperous Crozier is a late 9th-century or early 10th-century Irish Insular type crozier that would have been used as a ceremonial staff for bishops and high-status abbots. Its origins and medieval provenance are unknown until it was found fully intact by turf cutters c. 1831 near Prosperous, County Kildare. It did not receive attention from antiquarians until 1851, but is today identified as one of the earliest fully extant and thus perhaps the most historically important European crozier.

Made from yew wood, bronze, zinc and tin-alloy, the Prosperous' crook, like all such examples, is curved like a shepherd’s crook. It contains traces of inscriptions, and although the words are largely worn, credible interpretations were made in the 2010s that give a range for its origin and burial in the bog, where it was presumably deposited to hide from either local, Viking or English attackers.

It has been kept in the archaeology wing of the National Museum of Ireland (NMI) since the late 19th century and was extensively cleaned and refurbished in 1984 by the Ulster Museum.

== Description ==
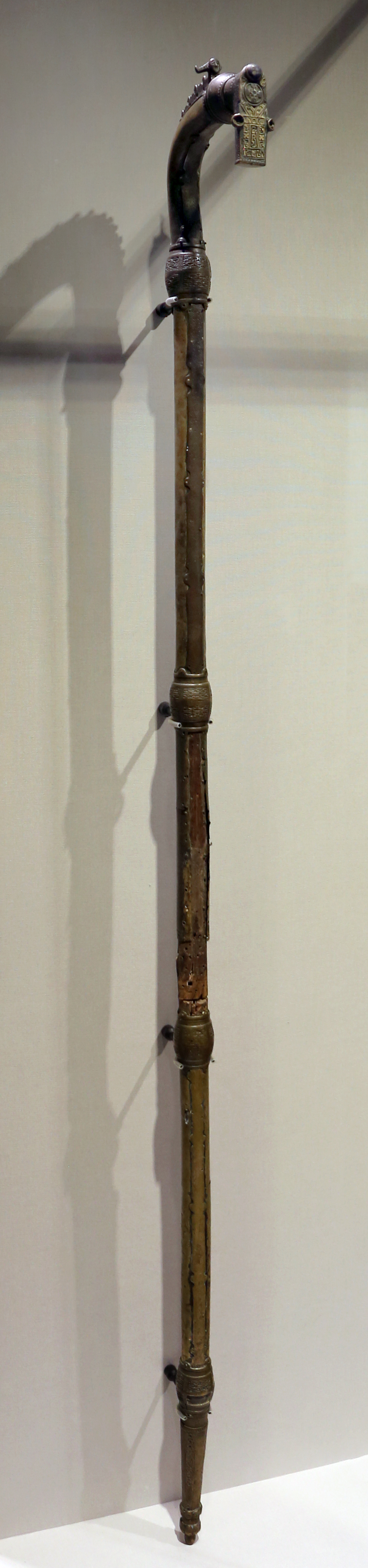
Full view of the crozier

The Prosperous is the longest intact Insular crozier at a height of 134 cm (53 in), and unusually has five rather than the usual four knopes. Unlike most other examples of its type, it was produced in a single phase with only minor structural repairs added in the later centuries. As the majority of other 9th- and 10th-century Insular croziers were refurbished and decorated in the late Middle Ages, it gives insight as to how such objects generally appeared during their original period of use.

Its wooden core is supported by three tubular copper-alloy shaft casings, which hold the crook, shaft, and ferrule.

=== Crook ===
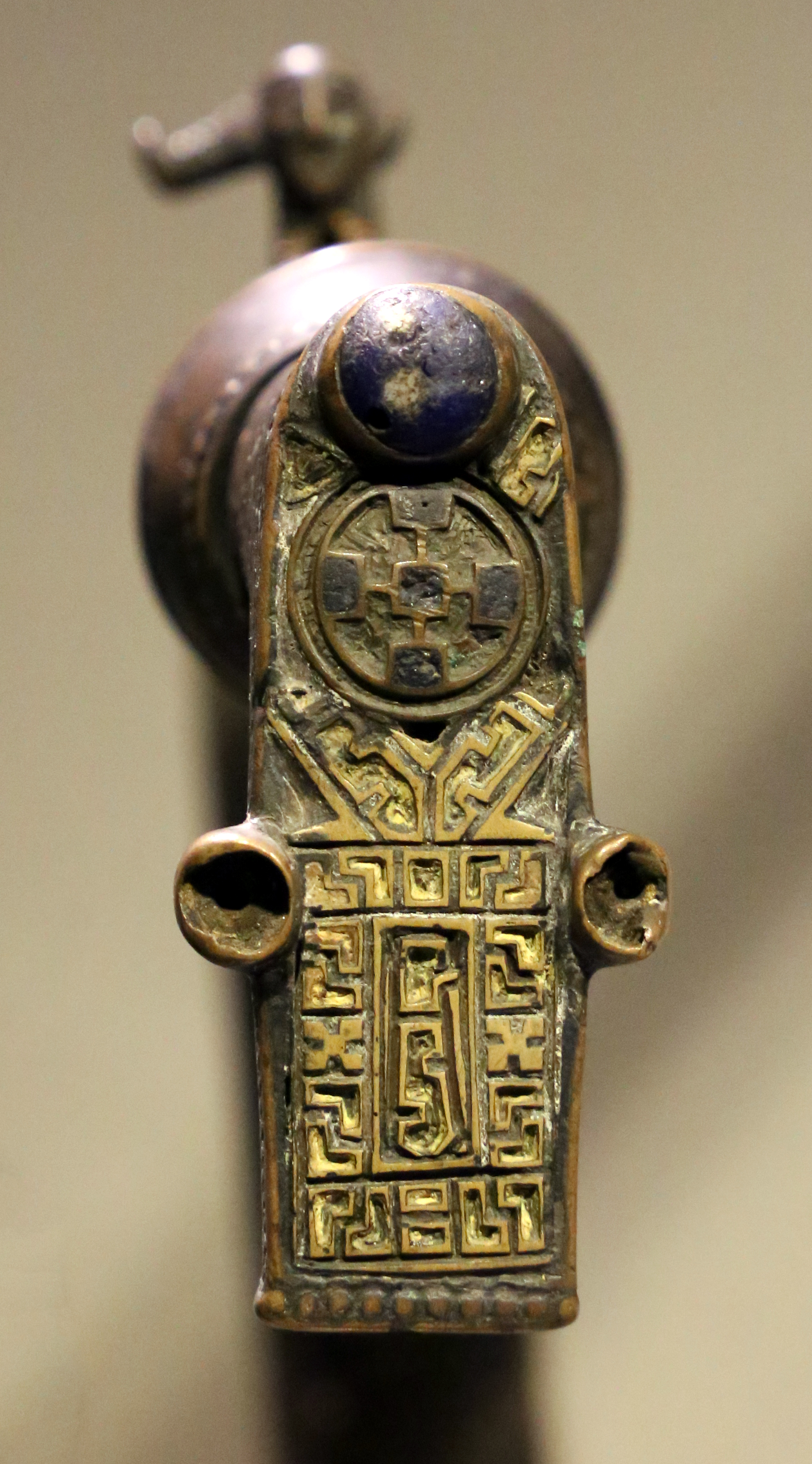
Detail of the drop

The crest (the semi-circular plate at the top of the crook) contains thirteen equidistant circular perforations along its side. It is lined by a row that contains eleven birds and terminates with a human head just above the drop.

The crook ends in a vertical section known as a drop, which is decorated with glass and champlevé enamel. Its upper section contains a blue glass stud, below which is a Greek cross coated with enamel and placed within a circle. The studs from the two projecting settings on either side are now lost. The central drop-plate consists of a series of enamel cells placed in a geometric pattern. Although their colourisation is now largely eroded, the cells were originally yellow and set on a red panel.

== Dating and inscriptions ==
The crozier is generally dated to at least 1,000 AD, based on the style of its interlace designs, which resemble pieces established as from 10th-century Dublin, as well as contemporary stone sculptures from the Isle of Man. The underside of the drop contains a later inscription that is very faded and damaged but was confidently interpreted in 2017 by the archaeologist Pádraig Ó Riain as "Sanc[t]ae Mar[i]ae Du[bl]i[n]iae", indicating that it was once owned by St. Mary's Abbey, Dublin, established as a Benedictine monastery in 1139 and dissolved in 1539. Given that that abbey was founded after the crozier's dating, it can be assumed that it was created for an earlier ecclesiastical site before ownership transferred to St. Mary's; although the location of that site remains unknown, the crozier's style indicated it may have been in the Dublin region.

It lacks the adornment of precious metals found in other contemporary Insular art metalwork objects, while some of the craftsmanship has been described as relatively basic, suggesting it originated from a moderately sized site, likely from a workshop in the Dublin region. Yet, as the archaeologist pointed out, "nevertheless, [it] was important enough to be kept for centuries before it was eventually buried in a bog."

== Condition ==
The crozier is in relatively good condition despite having been cut in half in the Middle Ages, presumably just before it was deposited in the bog. It was recombined in the 19th century, when a number of nails were also removed, leaving it fragile and structurally weak. It was conserved by the Ulster Museum in 1984.
