= Tau (disambiguation) =

Tau (Τ or τ) is the 19th letter of the Greek alphabet.

Tau may also refer to:

== Mathematics ==
- Tau (mathematics), a circle constant equal to 2π (6.28318...)
- Tau test in statistics (tau-a, tau-b and tau-c tests or Kendall tau rank correlation coefficient)
- Tau function (disambiguation), several

== Geography ==
- Tau, Norway, a small town in Strand municipality, Rogaland county, Norway
- Tău (disambiguation), two villages in Romania
- Ta‘ū, an island in the Manuʻa Island Group of American Samoa
- Ta'u County, a county in American Samoa
- Tau (Tongatapu), an island of the Tongatapu group in Tonga
- Tau (Haʻapai), an island of the Haʻapai group in Tonga
- Tau (Botswana), a village at the base of the Tswapong Hills in Botswana

== Science and technology ==
- TAU (spacecraft), a proposal to send a space probe to a thousand astronomical units from the Earth
- Tau (particle), also called Tau lepton, an elementary particle in particle physics
- Tau emerald, a species of dragonfly
- Tau neutrino a subatomic elementary particle
- Tau protein, a biochemical protein associated with microtubules
- Tau, the standard astronomical abbreviation for Taurus (constellation)
- Tau, a mutation in the Casein kinase 1 epsilon protein, in circadian biology
- Rational Tau, a UML and SysML modeling tool
- Opsanus tau, the scientific name for the oyster toadfish

== Arts and media ==
- Tau (film), a 2018 thriller film starring Maika Monroe
- Tău (Negură Bunget album), a 2015 album by Romanian black metal band Negură Bunget
- T'au, an alien race from Warhammer 40,000
- Pan Tau, hero of Czech films and television series
- Tau Zero, a novel by Poul Anderson
- Tau Volantis, a planet shown in Dead Space 3
- Tau Cannon, an energy weapon from the video game Half-Life
- Tau Films, an American visual effects and animation company
- Tau, a stellar system mentioned in the video game Warframe
- Tau (sculpture), a sculpture by Tony Smith

== Education ==
- Tama Art University
- Tel Aviv University
- Texila American University
- Anna University of Technology, Tiruchirappalli

== People ==
- Abel Tau, South African politician
- Jimmy Tau, South African football (soccer) player
- Max Tau, German-Norwegian writer, editor, and publisher
- Nicolae Țâu, Moldovan politician who was Foreign Minister of Moldova between 1990 and 1993
- Parks Tau, South African politician who was mayor of Johannesburg from 2011-2016
- Percy Tau (born 1994), South African international footballer
- Tebogo Tau, Botswana judge
- Tau (rapper), Polish rapper
- Devi Lal (politician), popularly known as Tau, Indian politician who was Deputy Prime Minister from 1989 to 1991

== Other ==
- Tau (mythology), an evil spirit in Guaraní mythology
- Tau effect, a sensory illusion relating to the perception of space
- Cross of Tau, a Christian symbol so called due to its resemblance to the letter Tau
- Tourist Association of Ukraine
- The Greek letter representing Expiration (options)

== See also ==
- Tau function (disambiguation)
- Tao Chinese philosophy
