= Crozier =

Ceremonial staff in Christianity

Western- and Eastern-style croziers

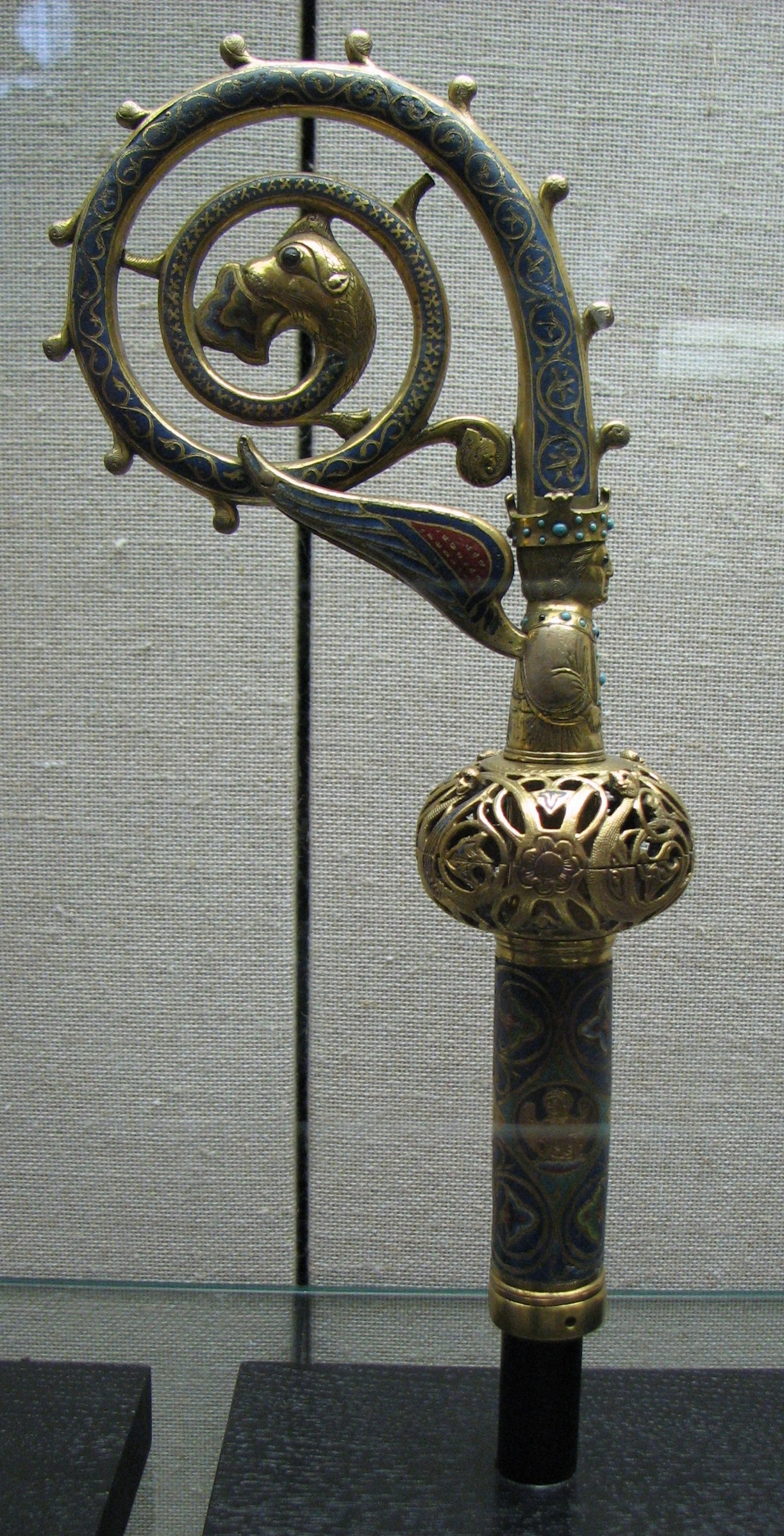
Western-style crozier of Archbishop Heinrich II of Finstingen (1260–86) in the Treasury of Trier Cathedral

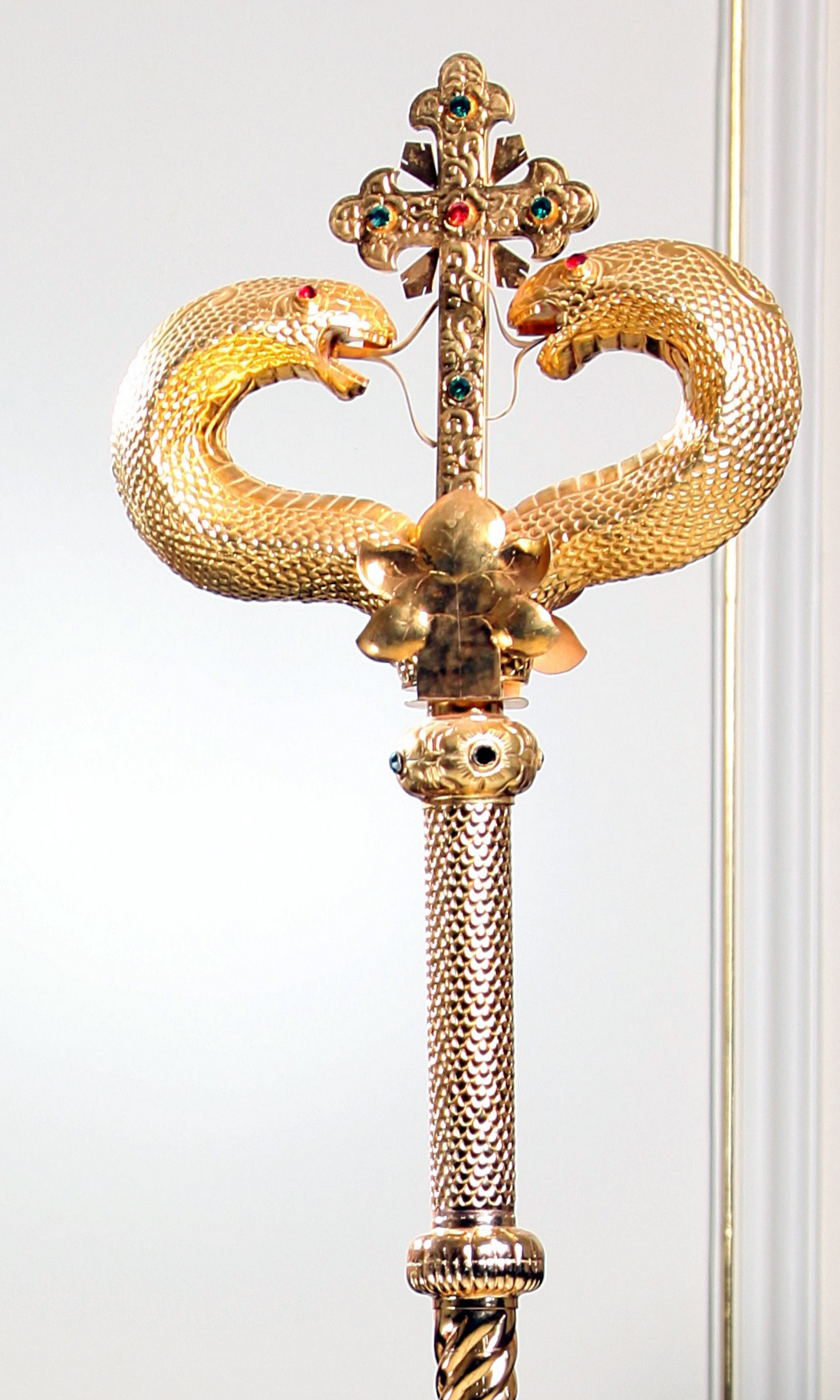
Eastern-style crozier of the Syriac Orthodox Patriarch of Antioch with serpents representing the staff of Moses

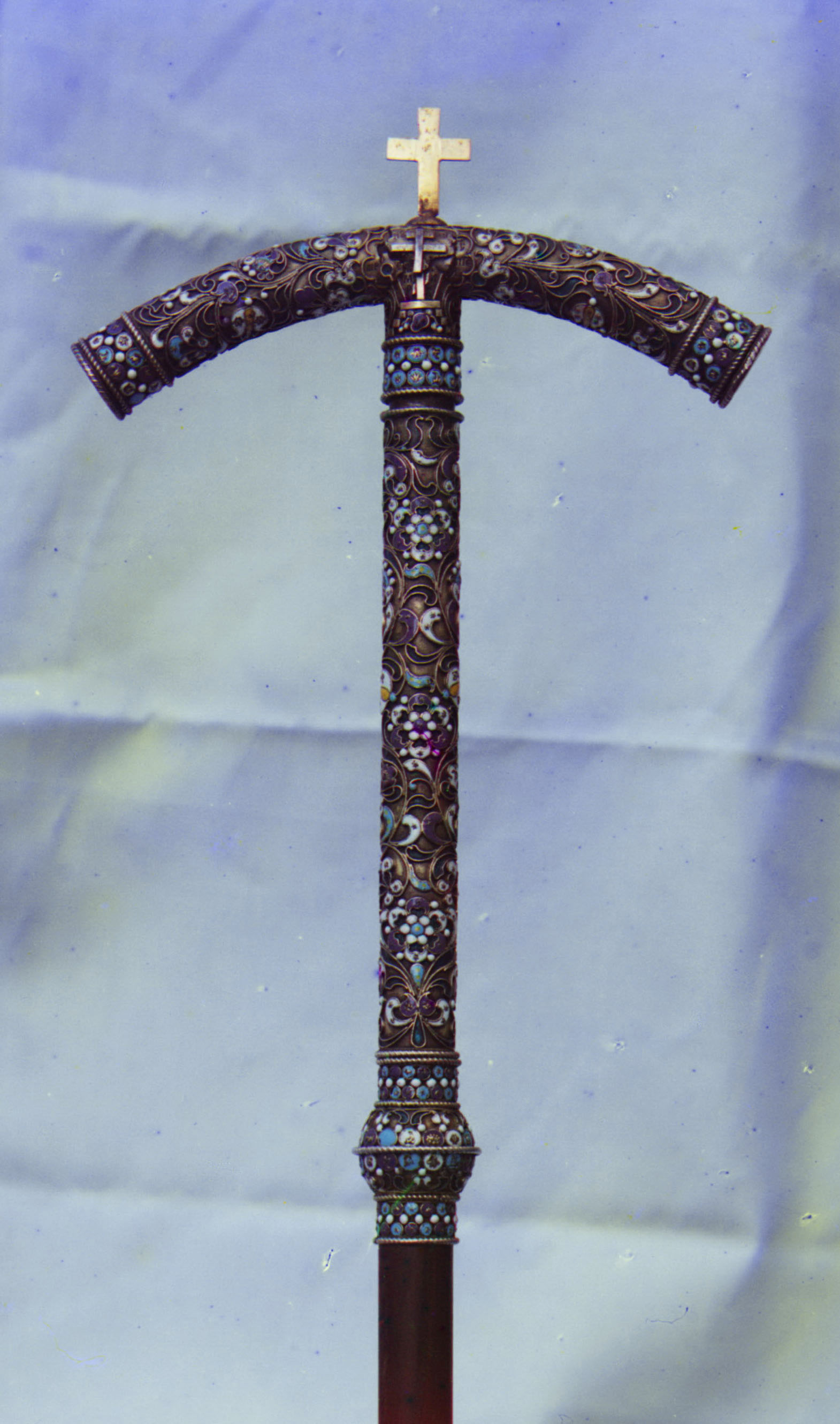
Eastern Orthodox tau-shaped crozier belonging to St. Dimitry of Rostov in Rostov museum

A crozier on the coat of arms of Basel, Switzerland which was ruled by Prince-Bishops during the Middle Ages

A crozier or crosier (also known as a paterissa, pastoral staff, or bishop's staff) is a stylized staff that is a symbol of the governing office of a bishop or abbot and is carried by high-ranking prelates of Roman Catholic, Eastern Catholic, Eastern Orthodox, Oriental Orthodox, Malankara Mar Thoma Syrian Church, Church of South India and some Anglican, Lutheran, United Methodist and Pentecostal churches.

In Western Christianity the crozier typically takes the form of a shepherd's crook, a tool used to manage flocks of sheep and herds of goats. In Eastern Christianity, the crozier has two common forms: tau-shaped, with curved arms, surmounted by a small cross; or a pair of sculptured serpents or dragons curled back to face each other, with a small cross between them.

Other typical insignia of prelates are the mitre, the pectoral cross, and the episcopal ring.

== History ==
The origin of the crozier as a staff of authority is uncertain, but there were many secular and religious precedents in the ancient world. One example is the lituus, the traditional staff of the ancient Roman augurs, as well as the Staff of Moses in the Hebrew Bible. Many other types of the staff of office were found in later periods, some continuing to the modern day in ceremonial contexts.

In the Western Church, the usual form has been a shepherd's crook. This relates to the many metaphorical references to bishops as the shepherds of their "flock" of Christians, following the metaphor of Christ as the Good Shepherd.

The Eastern Orthodox and Eastern Rite Catholic crozier is commonly tau-shaped, with curved arms and surmounted by a small cross, or with a pair of sculptured serpents or dragons on top, curled back to face each other, and a small cross between them. The symbolism in the latter case is of the bronze serpent, Nehushtan, made by Moses as related in Numbers 21:8–9. It is also reminiscent of the rod of the ancient Greek god Asclepius, whose worship was centered around the Aegean, including Asia Minor, indicating the role of the bishop as healer of spiritual diseases.

=== Staff of Moses ===
The Staff of Moses is first mentioned in the Book of Exodus (chapter 4, verse 2), when God appears to Moses in the burning bush. God asks what Moses has in his hand, and Moses answers "a staff" ("a rod" in the King James Version). The staff is miraculously transformed into a snake and then back into a staff. The staff is thereafter referred to as the "rod of God" or "staff of God" (depending on the translation).

"And thou shalt take this rod in thine hand, wherewith thou shalt do signs." And Moses went and returned to Jethro, his father in law, and said unto him, "Let me go, I pray thee, and return unto my brethren which are in Egypt and see whether they be yet alive." And Jethro said to Moses, "Go in peace." The LORD said unto Moses in Midian, "Go, return into Egypt: for all the men are dead which sought thy life." And Moses took his wife and his sons and set them upon an ass; and he returned to the land of Egypt: and Moses took the rod of God in his hand.

— Exodus 4 (KJV)

Moses and Aaron appear before the Pharaoh of the Exodus, when Aaron's rod is transformed into a serpent. The Pharaoh's sorcerers are also able to transform their own rods into serpents, but Aaron's swallows them. Aaron's rod is again used to turn the Nile blood-red. It is used several times on God's command to initiate the Plagues of Egypt.

During the Exodus, Moses stretches out his hand with the staff to part the Red Sea. While in the wilderness after leaving Egypt, Moses does not follow God's command to "speak ye unto the rock before their eyes", instead he strikes the rock with the rod to create a spring for the Israelites from which to drink. Because Moses did not sanctify God before them but said "Hear now, ye rebels; must we fetch you water out of this rock?" Thus, Moses failed by honoring himself and not God. For not doing what God commanded, God punished Moses by not letting him enter into the Promised Land (Book of Numbers 20:10–12).

Finally, Moses uses the staff in the battle at Rephidim between the Israelites and the Amalekites. When he holds up the "rod of God", the Israelites "prevail". When he drops it, their enemies gain the upper hand. Aaron and Hur help him to keep the staff raised until victory is achieved.

== Official use ==
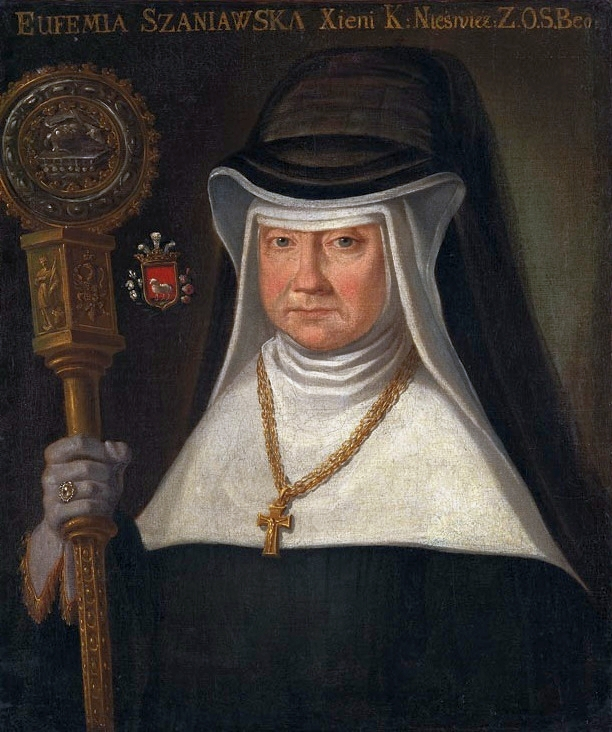
Eufemia Szaniawska, Abbess of the Benedictine Monastery in Nieśwież with a crozier, c. 1768, National Museum in Warsaw

The crozier is the symbol of the governing office of a bishop, abbot, or Apostle.

=== Western Christianity ===
In Western Christianity, the crozier (known as the pastoral staff, from the Latin pastor, shepherd) is shaped like a shepherd's crook. A bishop or church head bears this staff as "shepherd of the flock of God", particularly the community under his canonical jurisdiction, but any bishop, whether or not assigned to a functional diocese, may also use a crozier when conferring sacraments and presiding at liturgies. The Catholic Caeremoniale Episcoporum says that, as a sign of his pastoral function, a bishop uses a crozier within his territory, but any bishop celebrating the liturgy solemnly with the consent of the local bishop may also use it. It adds that, when several bishops join in a single celebration, only the one presiding uses a crozier.

A bishop usually holds his crozier with his left hand, leaving his right hand free to bestow blessings. The Caeremoniale Episcoporum states that the bishop holds the crozier with the open side of the crook forward, or towards the people. It also states that a bishop usually holds the crozier during a procession and when listening to the reading of the Gospel, giving a homily, accepting vows, solemn promises or a profession of faith, and when blessing people, unless he must lay his hands on them. When the bishop is not holding the crozier, it is put in the care of an altar server, known as the "crozier bearer", who may wear around their shoulders a shawl-like veil called a vimpa, so as to hold the crozier without touching it with their bare hands. Another altar server, likewise wearing a vimpa, holds the mitre when the bishop is not wearing it. In the Anglican tradition, the crozier may be carried by someone else walking before the bishop in a procession.

The crozier is conferred upon a bishop during his ordination to the episcopacy. It is also presented to an abbot at his blessing, an ancient custom symbolizing his shepherding of the monastic community. Although there is no provision for the presentation of a crozier in the liturgy associated with the blessing of an abbess, by long-standing custom an abbess may bear one when leading her community of nuns.

The traditional explanation of the crozier's form is that, as a shepherd's staff, it includes a hook at one end to pull back to the flock any straying sheep, a pointed finial at the other tip to goad the reluctant and the lazy, and a rod in between as a strong support.

The crozier is used in ecclesiastical heraldry to represent pastoral authority in the coats of arms of cardinals, bishops, abbots and abbesses. It was suppressed in most personal arms in the Catholic Church in 1969, and is since found on arms of abbots and abbesses, diocesan coats of arms and other corporate arms.

In the Church of God in Christ, the largest Pentecostal church in the United States, the presiding bishop bears a crozier as a sign of his role as positional and functional leader of the Church. In some jurisdictions of the United Methodist Church, bishops make use of croziers at ceremonial events.

==== Papal usage ====
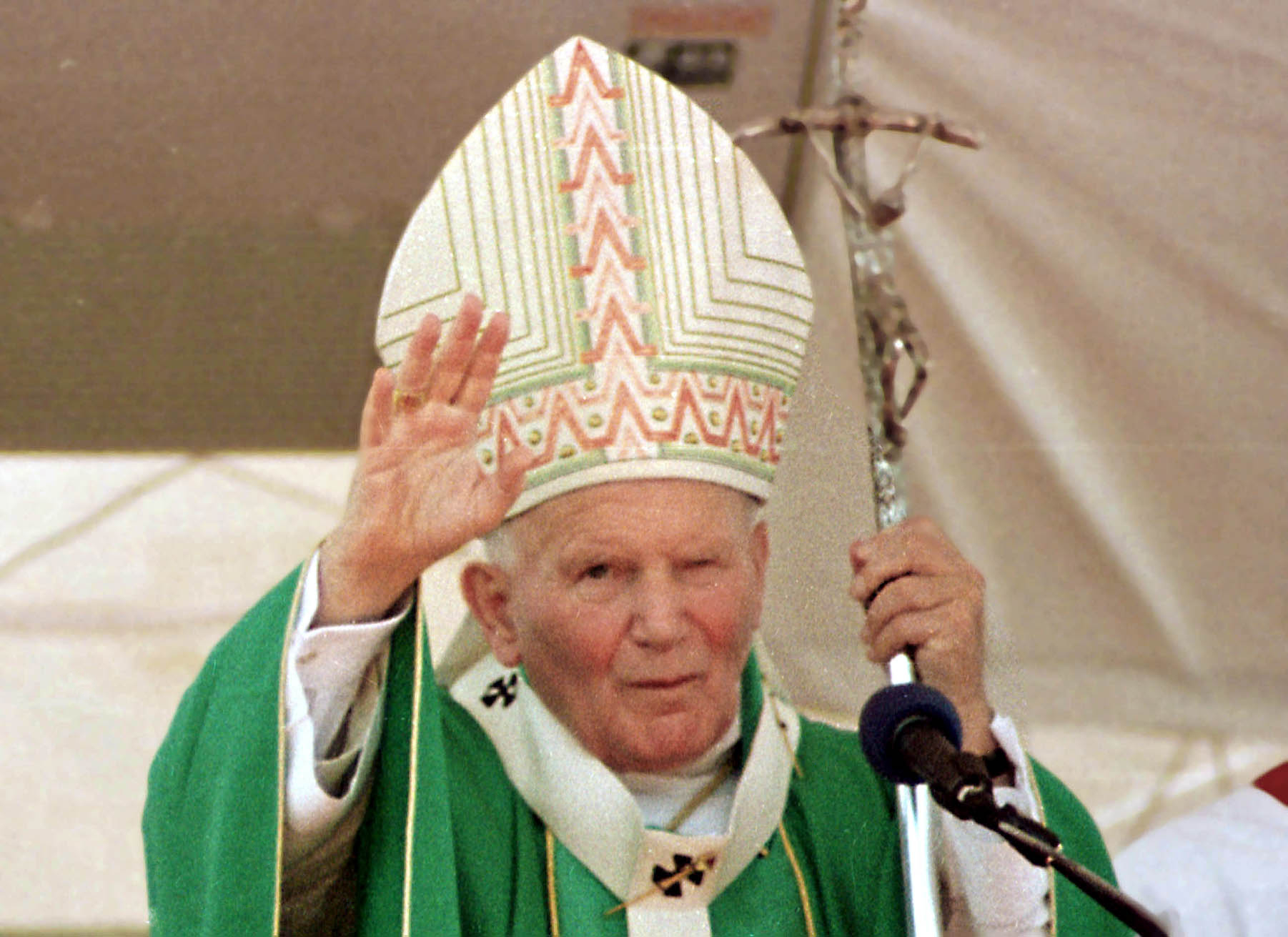
Pope John Paul II holding the Papal ferula, not a crozier, 5 October 1997

Popes no longer carry a crozier and instead carry the papal ferula. In the first centuries of the church, popes did carry a crozier but this practice was phased out and disappeared by the time of Pope Innocent III in the thirteenth century. In the Middle Ages, much as bishops carried a crozier, popes carried a papal cross with three bars, one more than the two bars found on croziers carried before archbishops in processions (see archiepiscopal cross). This too was phased out. Pope Paul VI introduced the modern papal pastoral staff, the papal ferula, in 1965. He and his successors have carried a few versions of this staff, but never a crozier.

=== Eastern Christianity ===
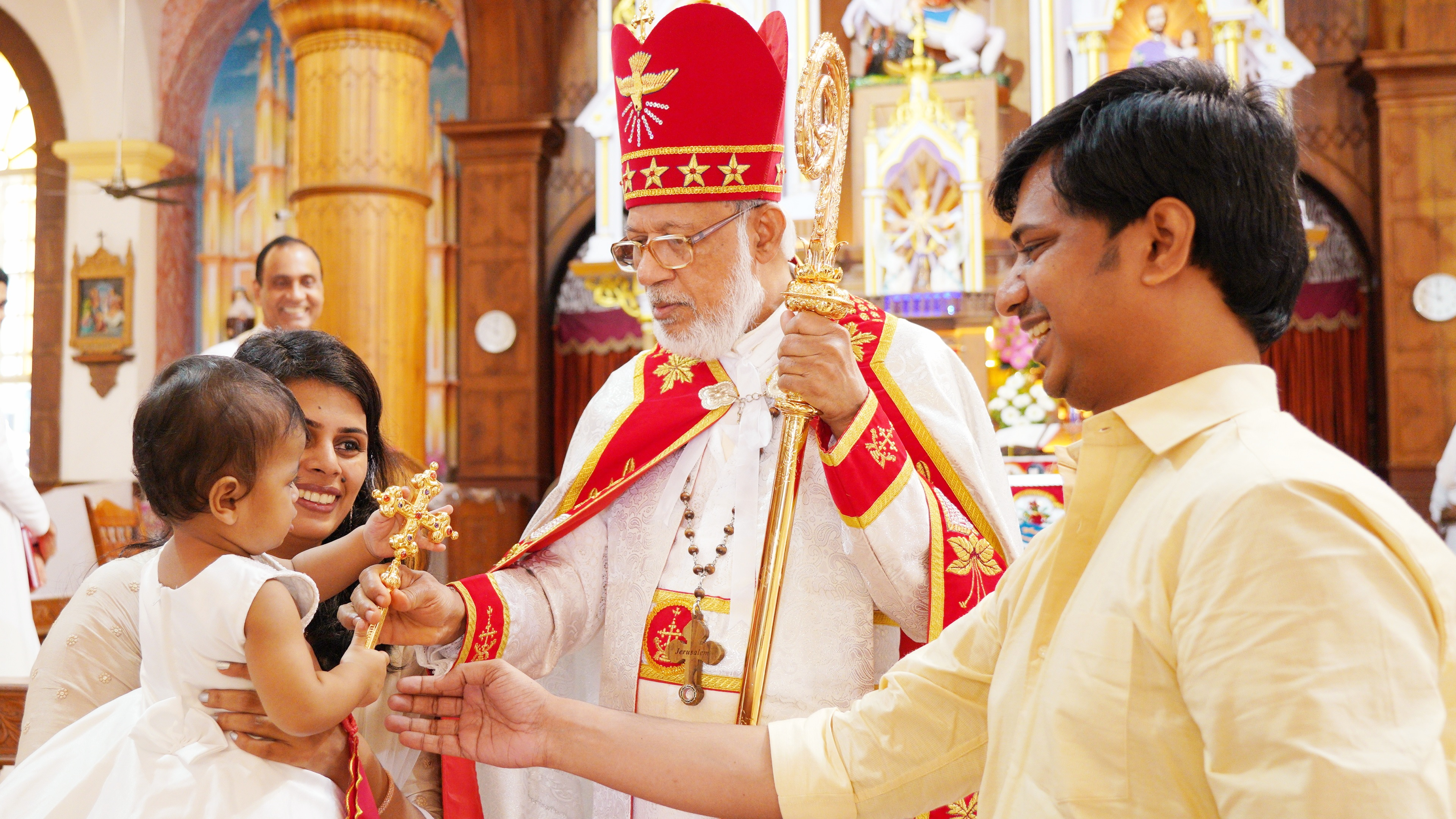
Syro-Malabar Major Archbishop Mar George Alencherry with his crozier.

In Eastern Christianity (Oriental Orthodoxy, Eastern Orthodoxy and Eastern Catholicism), bishops use a similar pastoral staff. When a bishop is consecrated, the crozier (Greek: paterissa, Slavonic: pósokh) is presented to him by the chief consecrator following the dismissal at the Divine Liturgy.

The Archbishop of Cyprus has the unique privilege in canon law of carrying a paterissa shaped like an imperial sceptre. This is one of the Three Privileges granted to the Orthodox Church of Cyprus by Byzantine Emperor Zeno (the other two being to sign his name in cinnabar, i.e., ink coloured vermilion by the addition of the mineral cinnabar, and to wear purple instead of black cassocks under his vestments).

An Eastern archimandrite (high-ranking abbot), hegumen (abbot) or hegumenia (abbess) who leads a monastic community also bears a crozier. It is conferred on them by the bishop during the Divine Liturgy for the elevation of the candidate. When he is not vested for worship, a bishop, archimandrite or abbot uses a staff of office topped with a silver pommel.

==== Oriental Orthodoxy ====
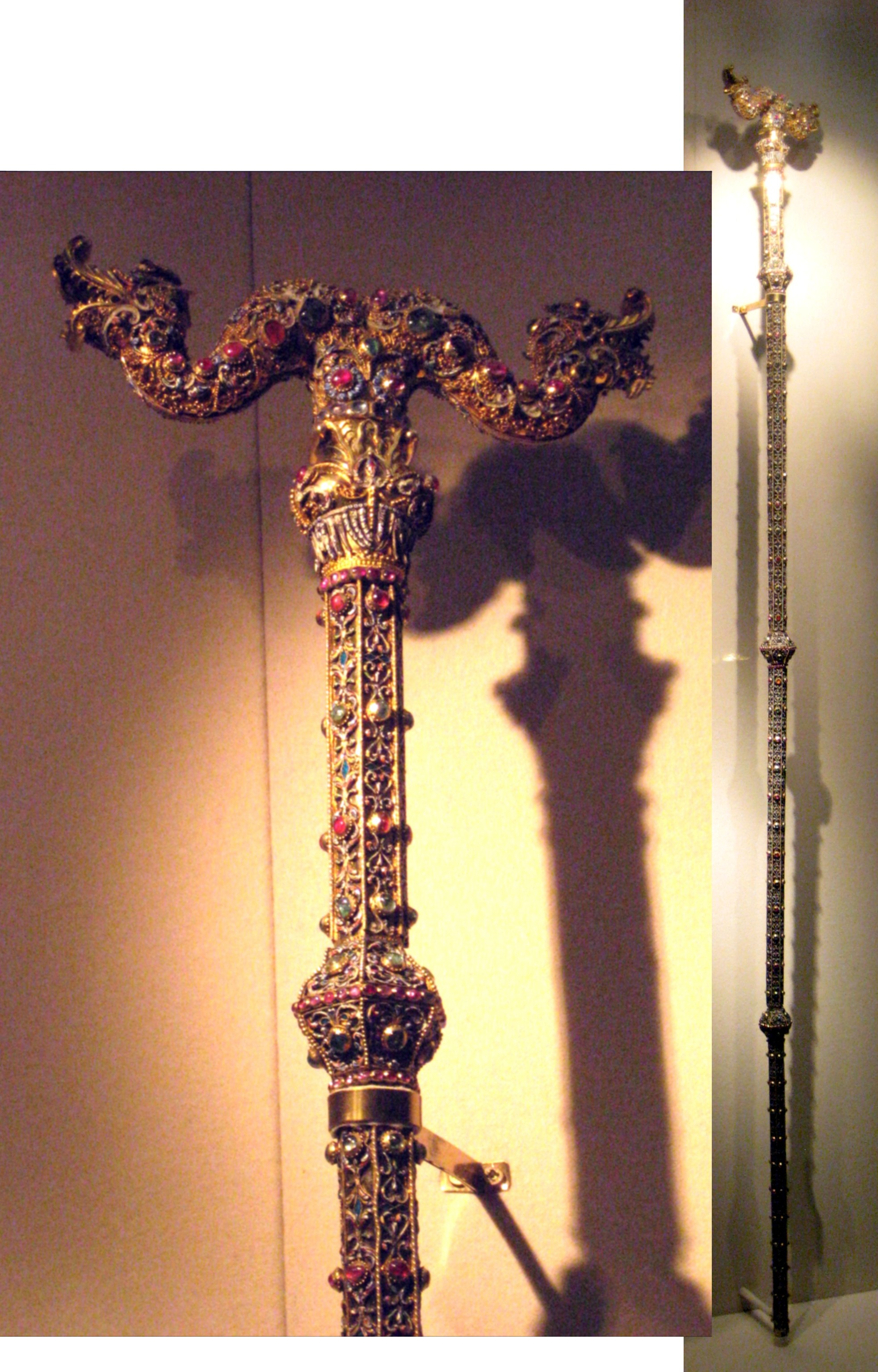
A crozier of the Vardapet, Armenian Apostolic Church, 19th century

In the Oriental Orthodox churches, croziers are used as pastoral staffs held by bishops. The Armenian Apostolic Church uses both Eastern- and Western-style croziers, while the Syriac Orthodox Church, Indian Orthodox Church and Marthoma Syrian Church have croziers that are thicker than their Eastern counterparts. Clerics of the Ethiopian Orthodox Tewahedo Church and the Eritrean Orthodox Tewahedo Church use croziers that look exactly like the Greek ones.

In the Coptic Orthodox Church of Alexandria, croziers are sometimes somewhat longer and are always decorated with a blood-red cloth around the top cross and the serpents. This symbolizes the bishop's responsibility for the blood of his flock.

== Description ==
Croziers are often made or decorated in precious metals, or are at least gilded or silver-plated. Underneath, the core and shaft is often wood, and some are entirely made of wood, though this is more common for croziers carried by abbots rather than bishops. Ivory, from the walrus or elephant, was often used in the Middle Ages.

=== Western croziers ===
Croziers used by Western bishops have curved or hooked tops, similar in appearance to staves traditionally used by shepherds, hence they are also known as crooks. In some languages there is only one term referring to this form, such as the German Krummstab or Dutch kromstaf. The crook itself (i.e., the curved top portion) may be formed as a simple shepherd's crook, terminating in a floral pattern, reminiscent of the Aaron's rod, or in a serpent's head. It may encircle a depiction of the bishop's coat of arms or the figure of a saint. In some very ornate croziers, the place where the staff meets the crook may be designed to represent a church.

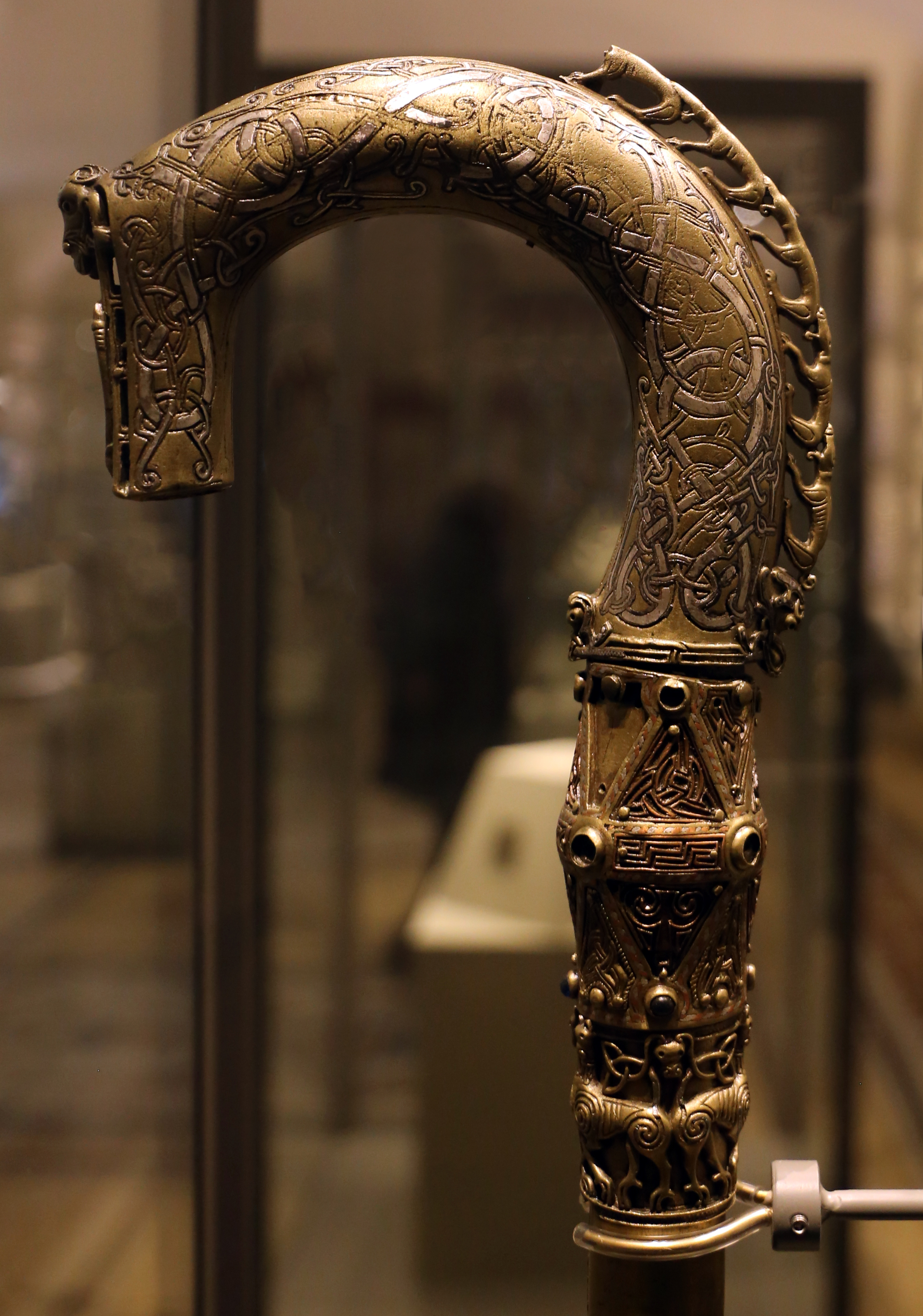
Crook of the late 11th century Irish Insular Clonmacnoise Crozier. National Museum of Ireland – Archaeology, Dublin

Insular croziers, produced in Britain and Ireland in the Early Middle Ages, have a more simple shape, perhaps closer to actual shepherd's crooks. They were regarded as important relics of church leaders, and have survived in untypical numbers, including the Clonmacnoise Crozier, Kells Crozier, Lismore Crozier, Prosperous Crozier, River Laune Crozier, St. Columba's Crozier, St. Fillan's Crozier, and St. Mel's Crozier.

In previous times, a cloth of linen or richer material, called the sudarium (literally, "sweat cloth"), was suspended from the crozier at the place where the bishop would grasp it. This was originally a practical application which prevented the bishop's hand from sweating and discolouring (or being discoloured by) the metal. The invention of stainless steel in the late 19th century and its subsequent incorporation in material used for croziers rendered moot its original purpose and it became more elaborate and ceremonial in function over time. In heraldry, the sudarium is often still depicted when croziers occur on coats of arms.

In the Roman Catholic Church, the crozier is always carried by the bishop with the crook turned away from himself; that is to say, facing toward the persons or objects he is facing, regardless of whether he is the Ordinary or not. The Sacred Congregation of Rites on 26 November 1919, stated in a reply to the following question,

In case an outside Bishop uses a Bishops' staff, this being either required by the function or permitted by the Ordinary, in what direction should he hold the upper part, or crook? Reply. Always with the crook turned away from himself, that is toward the persons or objects which he is facing. (AAS 12-177)

=== Eastern croziers ===
The croziers carried by Eastern bishops, archimandrites, abbots and abbesses differ in design from the Western crozier. The Eastern crozier is shaped more like a crutch than a shepherd's staff.

The sudarium or crozier mantle is still used in the Eastern churches, where it is usually made of a rich fabric such as brocade or velvet, and usually embroidered with a cross or other religious symbol, trimmed with galoon around the edges and fringed at the bottom. The sudarium is normally a rectangular piece of fabric with a string sewn into the upper edge which is used to tie the sudarium to the crozier that can be drawn together to form pleats. As the sudarium has grown more elaborate, bishops no longer hold it between their hand and the crozier, but place their hand under it as they grasp the crozier, so that it is visible.

== Gallery ==
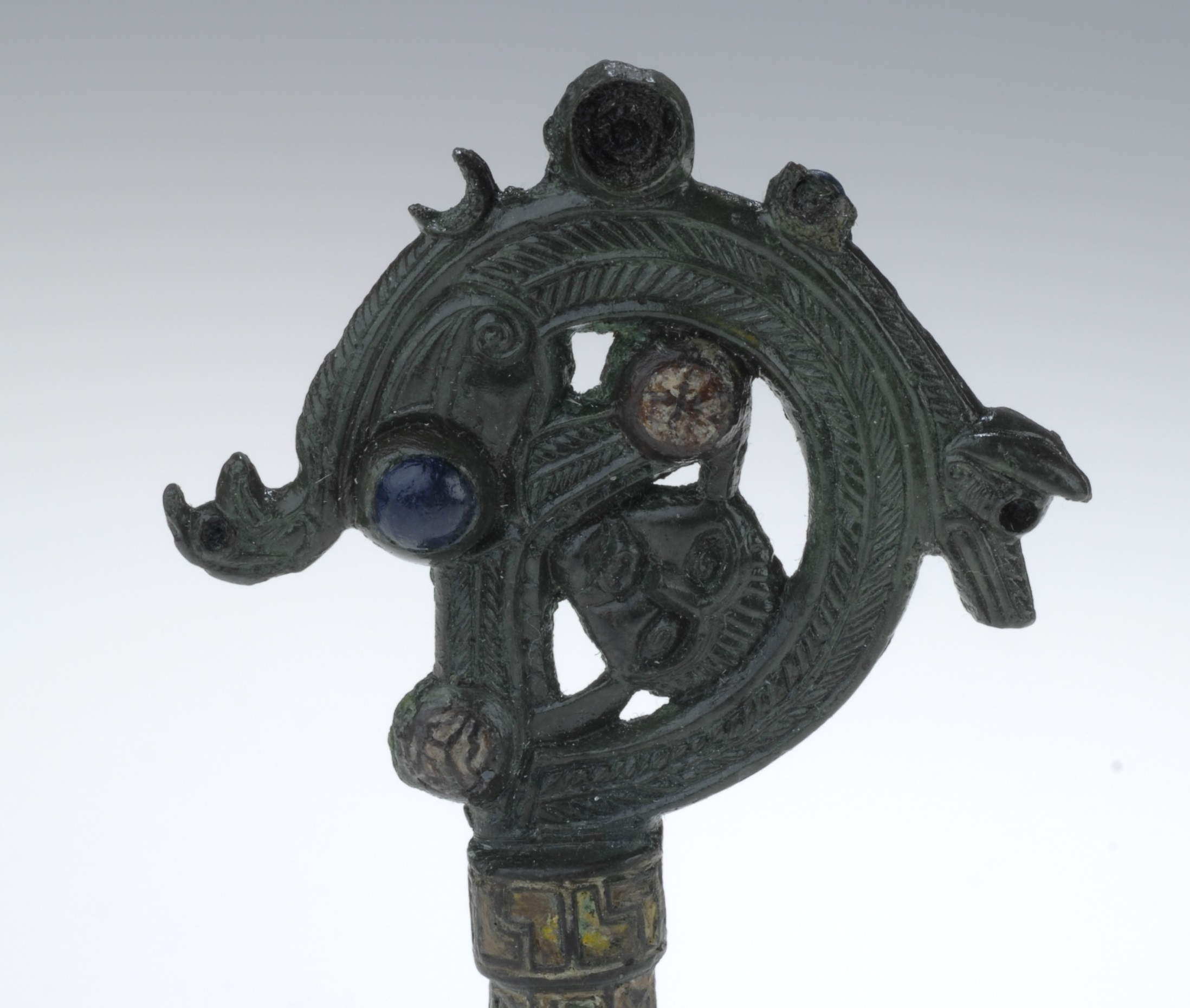
Copy of the Aghadoe Crozier, Swedish History Museum, Stockholm. Originating from Aghadoe, County Kerry in the early 12th century, the crozier is formed from a single block of Walrus ivory, and contains a spiral design on the crook showing the head of an animal biting a human figure.

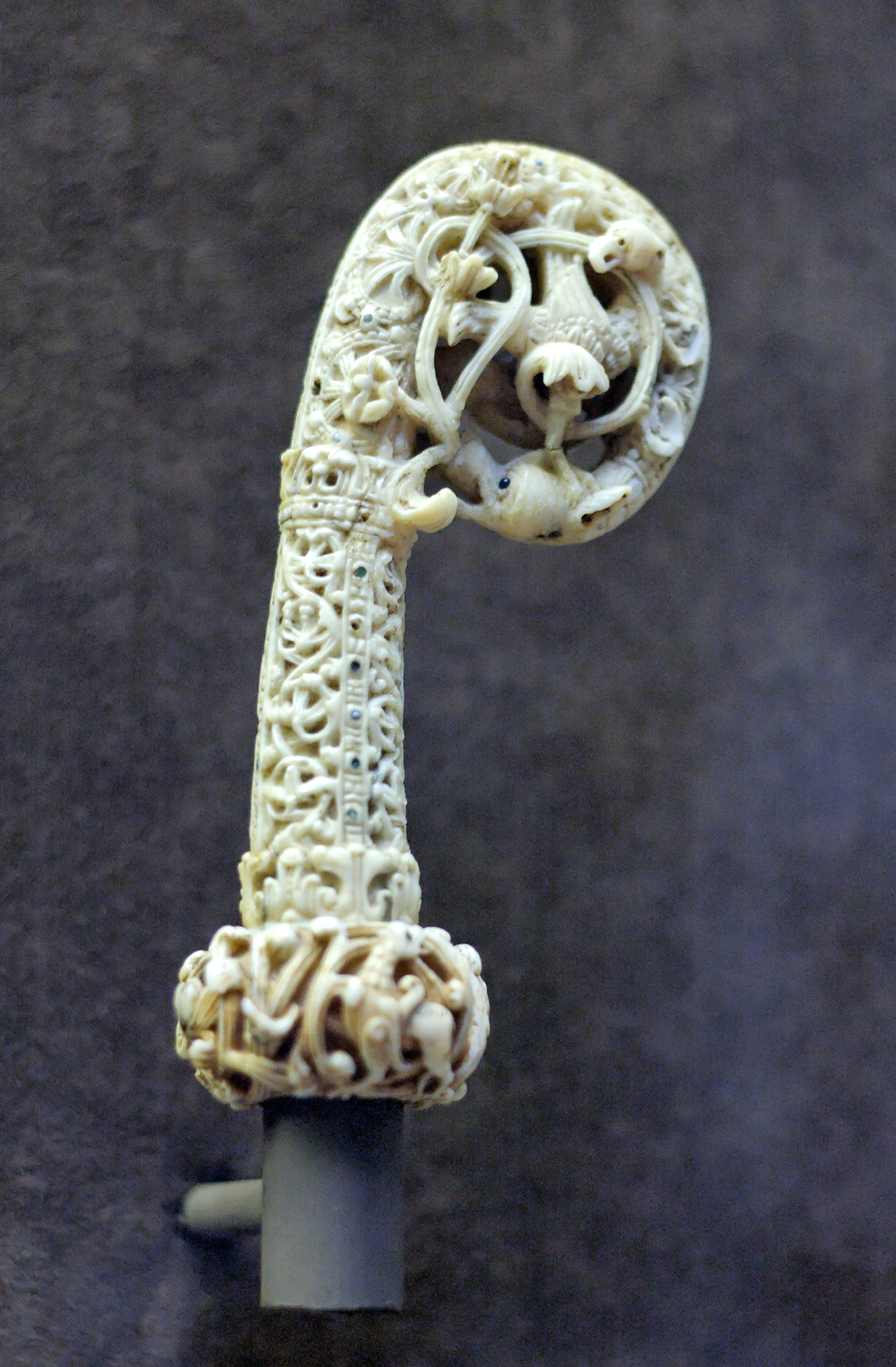
Walrus tusk, Holy Spirit as a dove, England, c. 1120–1130, Musée national du Moyen Âge, Paris

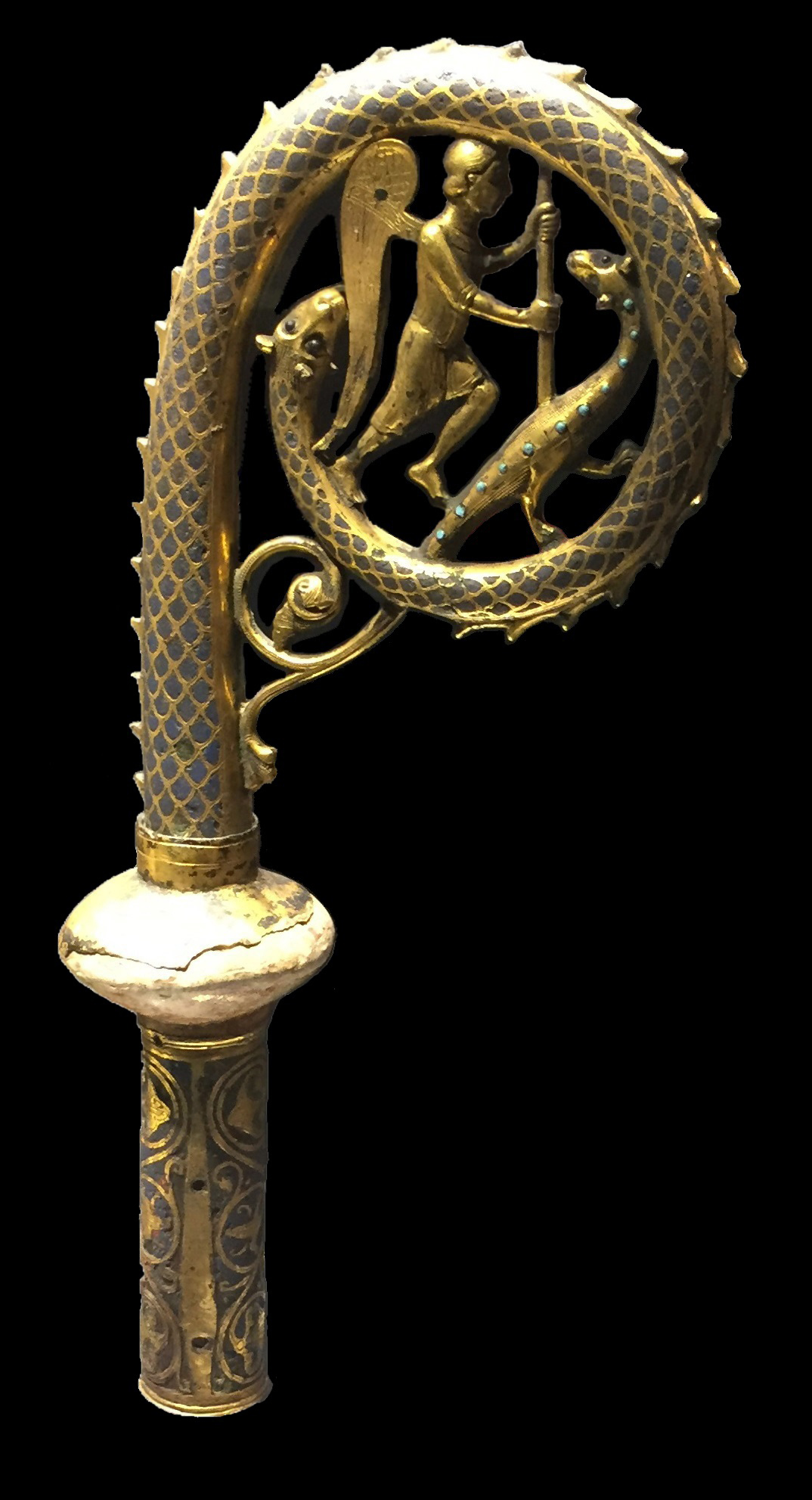
Archangel Michael defeating the dragon, Limoges enamel, The Museum of Gloucester, 1220–1250

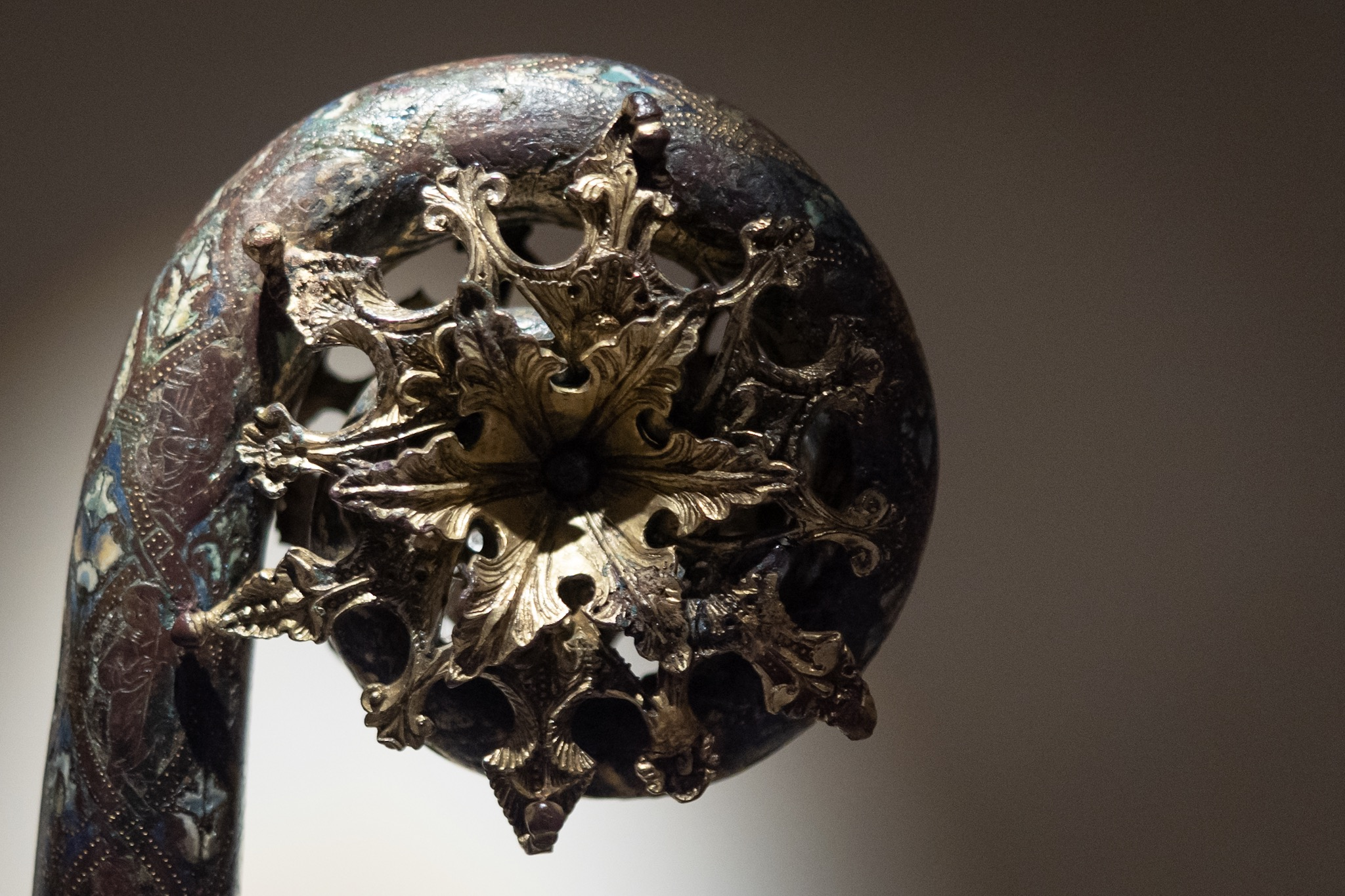
Crozier head with floral cluster, English, late 12th century

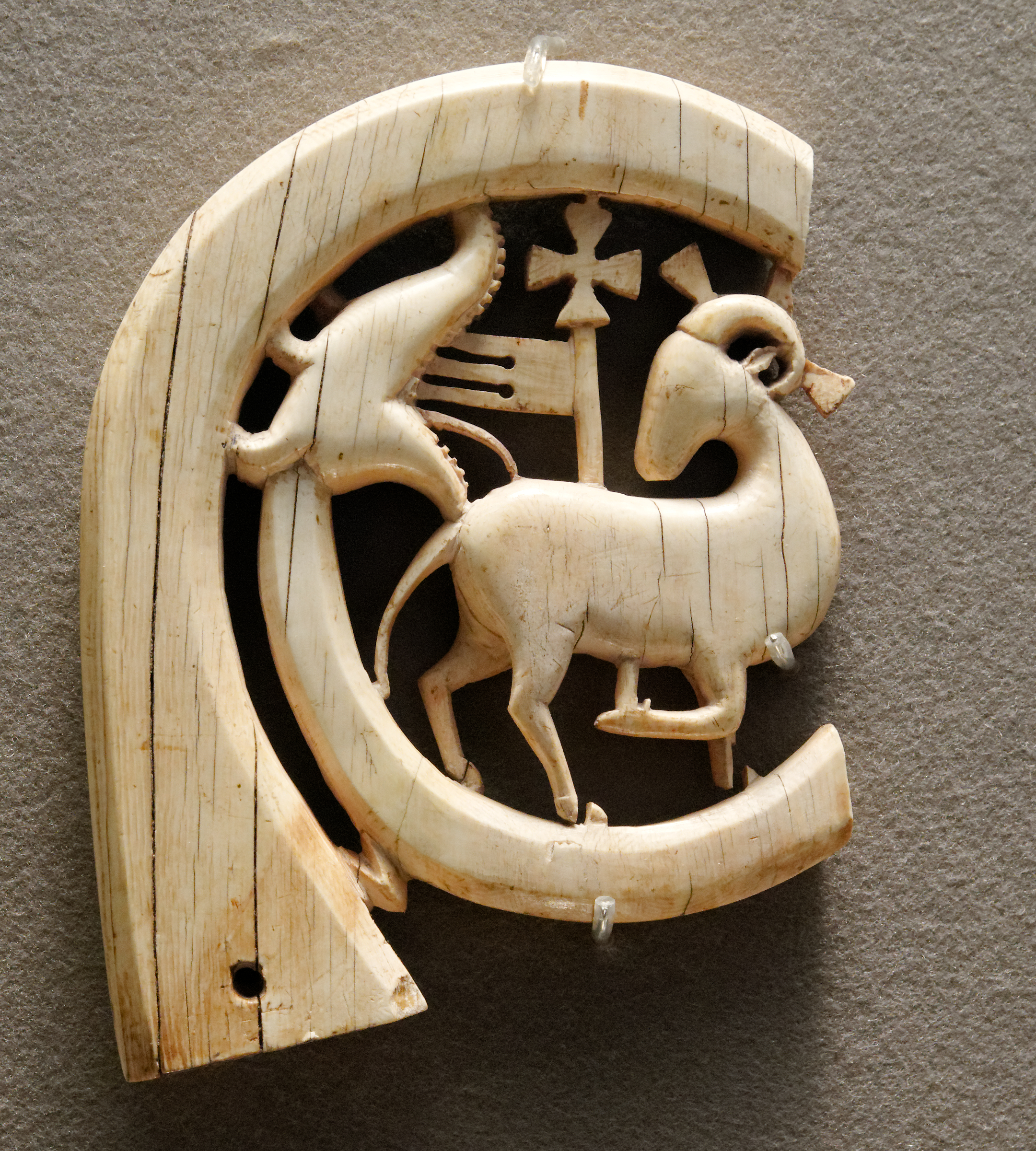
Ivory crozier showing the Agnus Dei, Italy, 13th century, Musée du Louvre

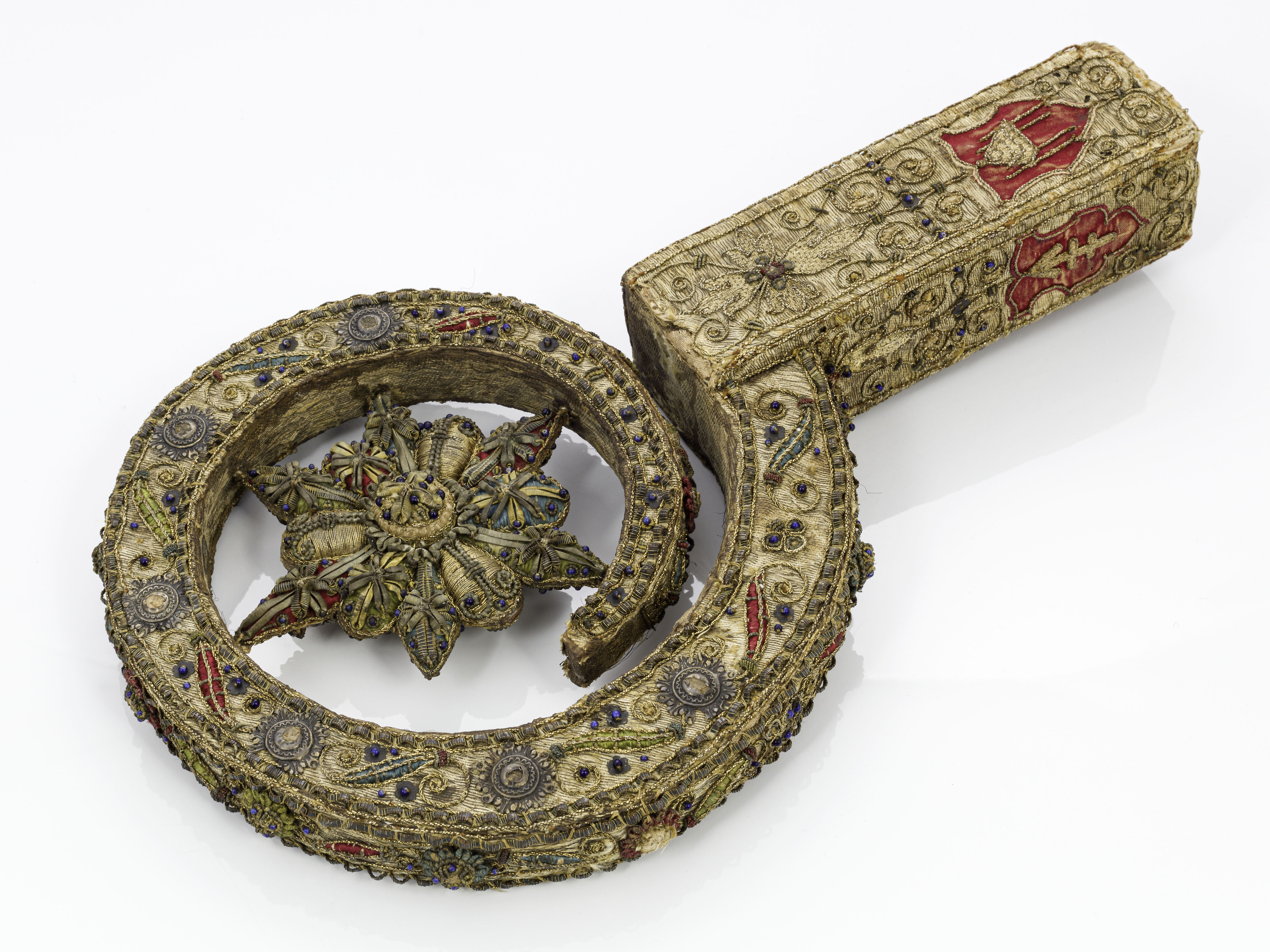
A traveling crozier, covered with embroidered fabric, 16th century, Czech Republic. Jagiellonian University Museum

== See also ==
- Khakkhara
