= River Laune Crozier =

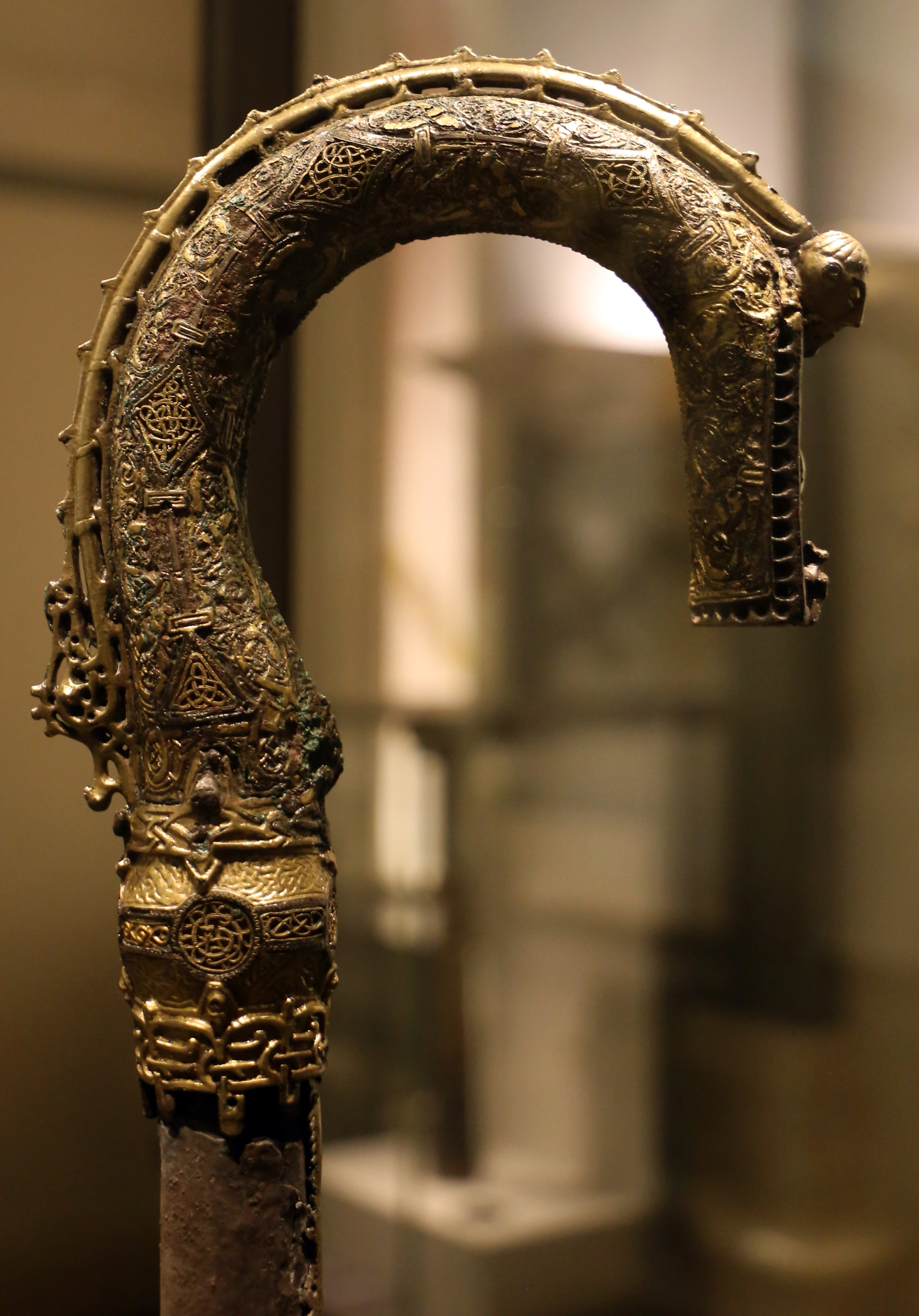
- Detail of the crozier's crook
- Material: wood, silver, copper-alloy, gold, niello
- Size: height: 1.5 m
- Created: late 11th century
- Discovered: 1867; River Laune, Ireland
- Discovered by: Denis O'Sullivan
- Present location: National Museum of Ireland, Dublin

The River Laune Crozier (or Innisfallen or Dunloe Crozier) is a late 11th-century Insular crozier, now at the Archaeology branch of the National Museum of Ireland. The object would have been commissioned as a staff of office for a senior clergyman, most likely a bishop. It consists of a wooden core decorated with fitted bronze and silver metal plates. Although the metalwork is somewhat corroded in parts, it is fully intact and considered one of the finest surviving Irish examples, alongside those found at Clonmacnoise and Lismore.

Its drop plate (the hollow box-like extension at the end of the crook) shows a human figure in high relief with a long thin nose, spiral ears and a beard that radiates out and intertwines with the designs around him.

It was discovered in 1867 in the bed of the River Laune, near the Lakes of Killarney in County Kerry, by a fisherman who initially mistook it as either a salmon or a gun, before establishing it as a "curious handstick". It was first exhibited at the Victoria and Albert Museum (then the South Kensington Museum) in 1869, on loan from John Coffey, Bishop of Kerry.

== Description ==
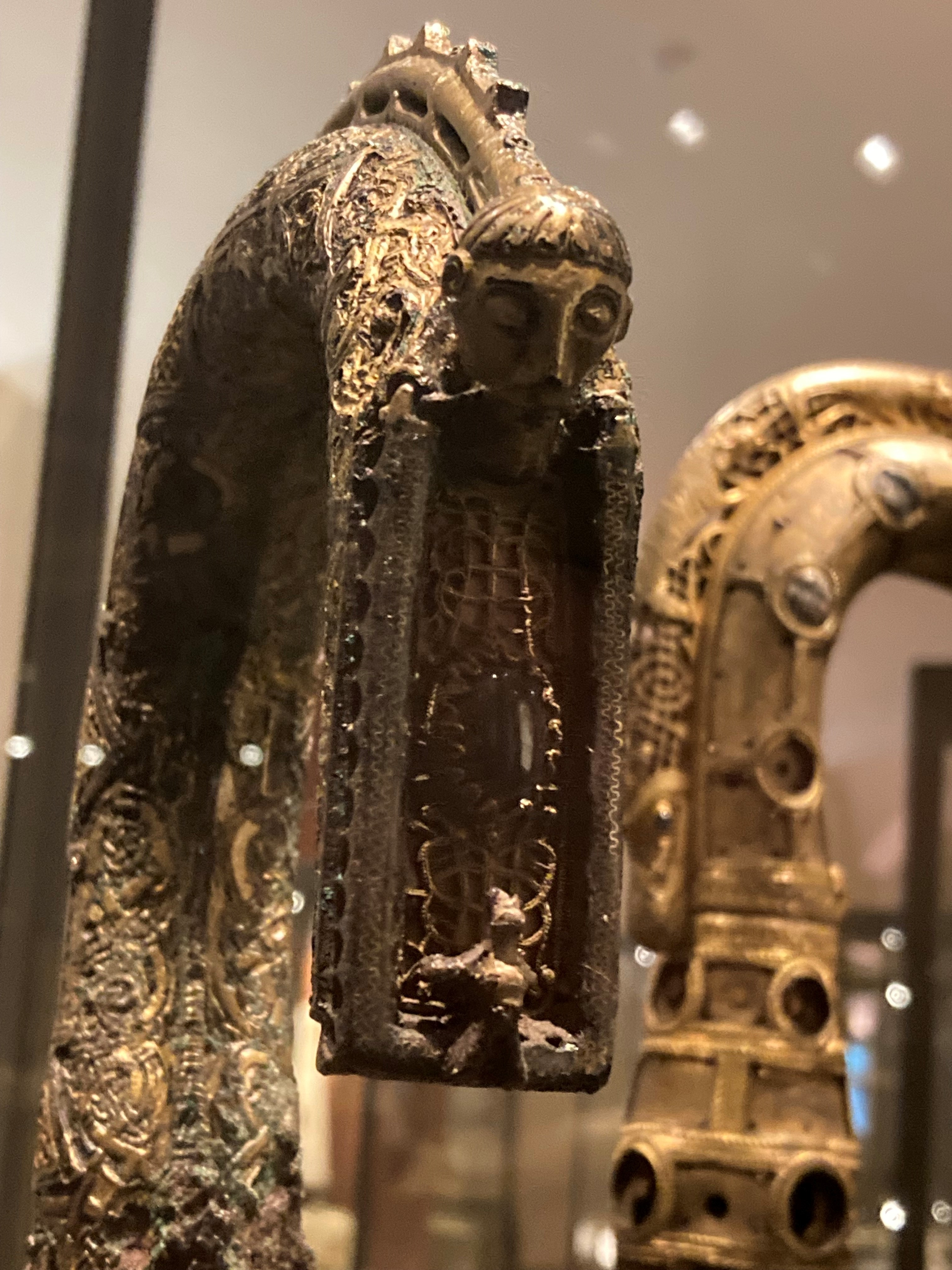
Detail of the crozier's drop plate showing a human figure with a monk's haircut and a long, thin nose. The Lismore Crozier is pictured to the right.

The River Laune Crozier is of especially fine workmanship and unusual in that its metalwork is mostly silver rather than the more typical copper alloy. Four panels contain elaborate gilded filigree. The staff is 111.5 cm (40 in) long and the hook is 17 cm (6.7 in) wide. The crook was cast as a single piece, to which the drop-plate and openwork crest were attached. Considering it spent an estimated 500–600 years buried underwater, it is in good condition, with its structure fully intact; some of the metal is corroded, and parts of the decorative panels or inserts are missing.

The shaft comprises three separate tubes of silver bent and joined by four decorative and elaborate knops. The crest panels contain both zoomorphic and abstract patterns and are bordered by bands of niello with inlaid gilt wire. Each side of the crook contains nine representations of imagined or fantastic animals rendered in low relief, with open mouths, front paws, and Ringerike style interlace patterns emanating from their heads before intertwining with their bodies.

Similar to the Clonmacnoise Crozier, the drop (i.e., the plate at the front of the crook) shows a human head in high relief. The man has oval eyes, a long, thin nose, a beard, and a handlebar moustache that radiates outward and intertwines with the designs around him. He has spiral ears and a long, square chin. The panel is decorated with abstracted interlaced filigree, while the base of the drop shows an animal with large ears, also in high relief. The insert below the drop is decorated with filigree and zoomorphic designs.

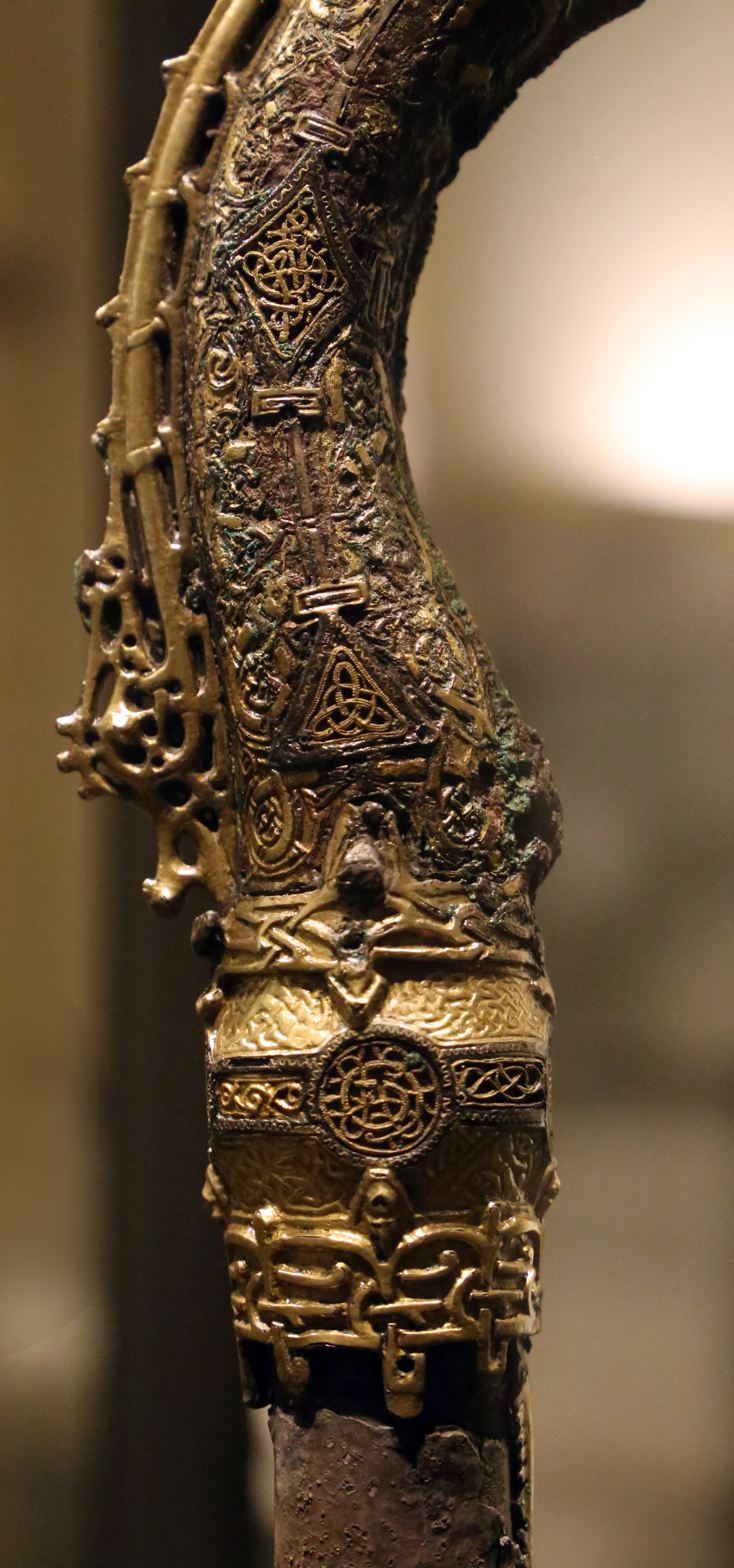
Crest on the head of the crook

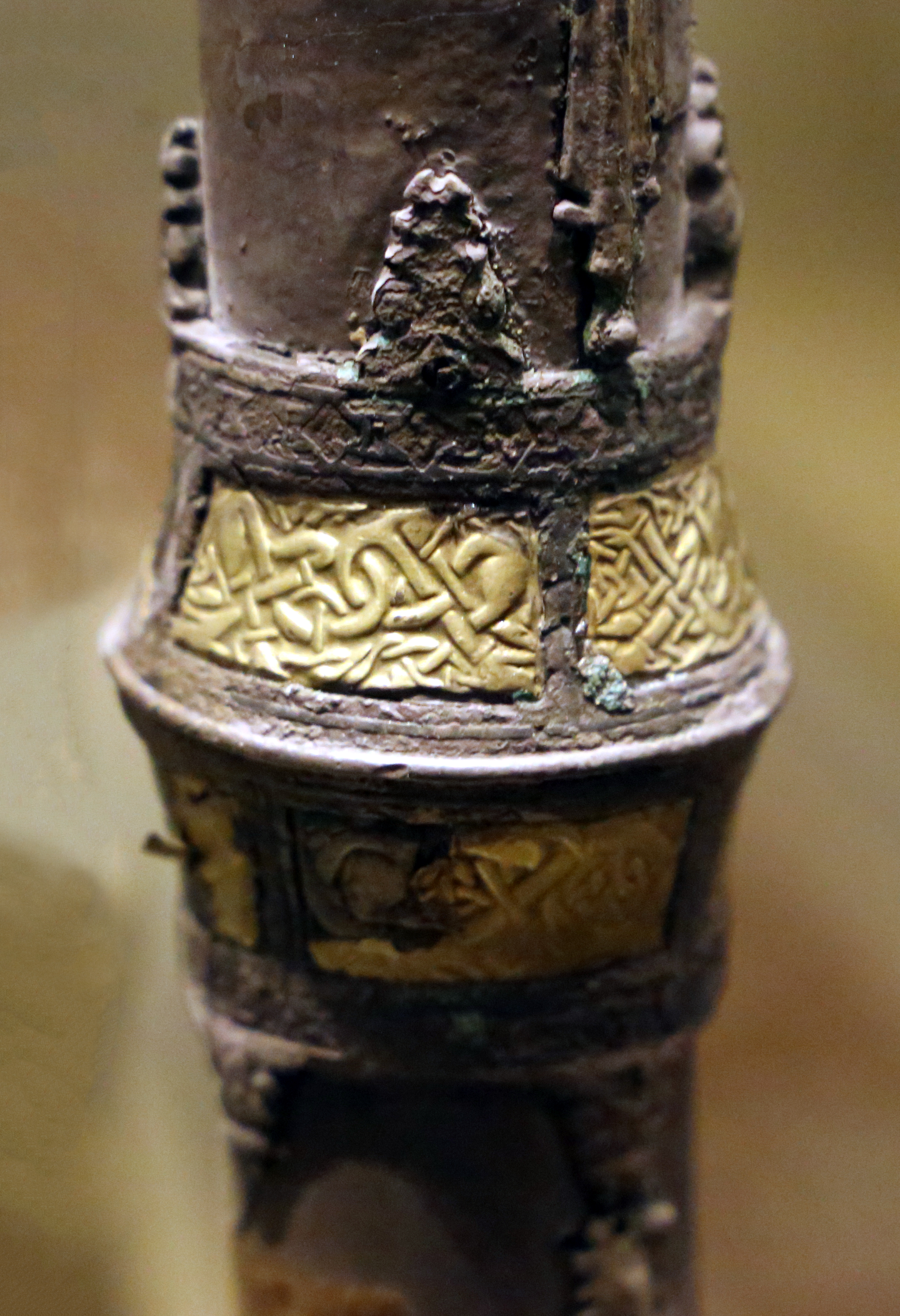
Middle knop

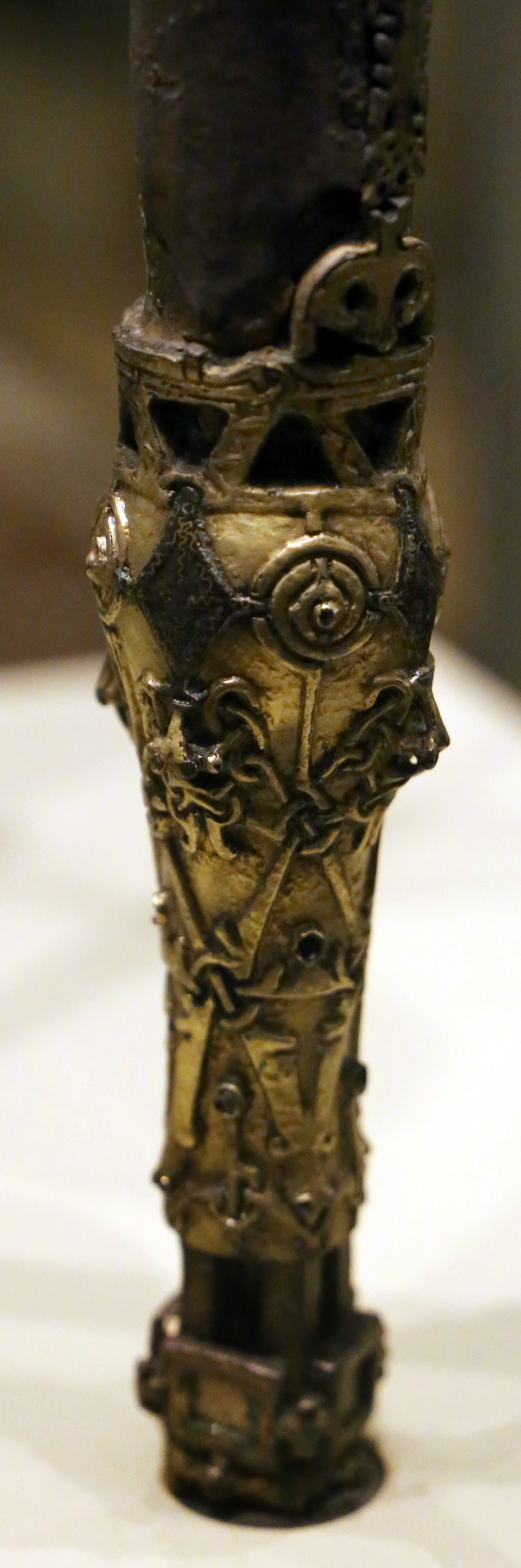
Tappering ferrule at crozier's base

== Provenance ==
The crozier was discovered in 1867 buried in the bed of the River Laune, near Beaufort bridge and Dunloe Castle, in Killarney, County Kerry. The find was made by local man Denis O'Sullivan while boat fishing for salmon. O'Sullivan said that the water was especially low and clear that day, and he at first mistook it for a salmon lying at the bottom of the river. After it did not move when he hit it with his rod, he realised it was inanimate, but was able to drag it out of the water. He at first thought it was a gun, but then realised it was a kind of "curious handstick". When the object was identified as a highly valuable and rare early medieval crozier, O'Sullivan became a local celebrity, and sold the object to Moriarty for £18, declaring that "this was far and away the best salmon he ever landed".

It passed to John Coffey and again to Charles O'Sullivan, both bishops of Kerry. It came to international prominence when displayed at the Victoria and Albert Museum (then the South Kensington Museum) in 1869, and for the Royal Society of Antiquaries of Ireland in 1891. While displayed at the V&A, it was described as "one of the most perfect specimens of early Irish art ... that has survived to this day". More recently, the sophistication of its craftsmanship was compared to that of the Cross of Cong and the Shrine of St. Patrick's bell.

== Dating ==
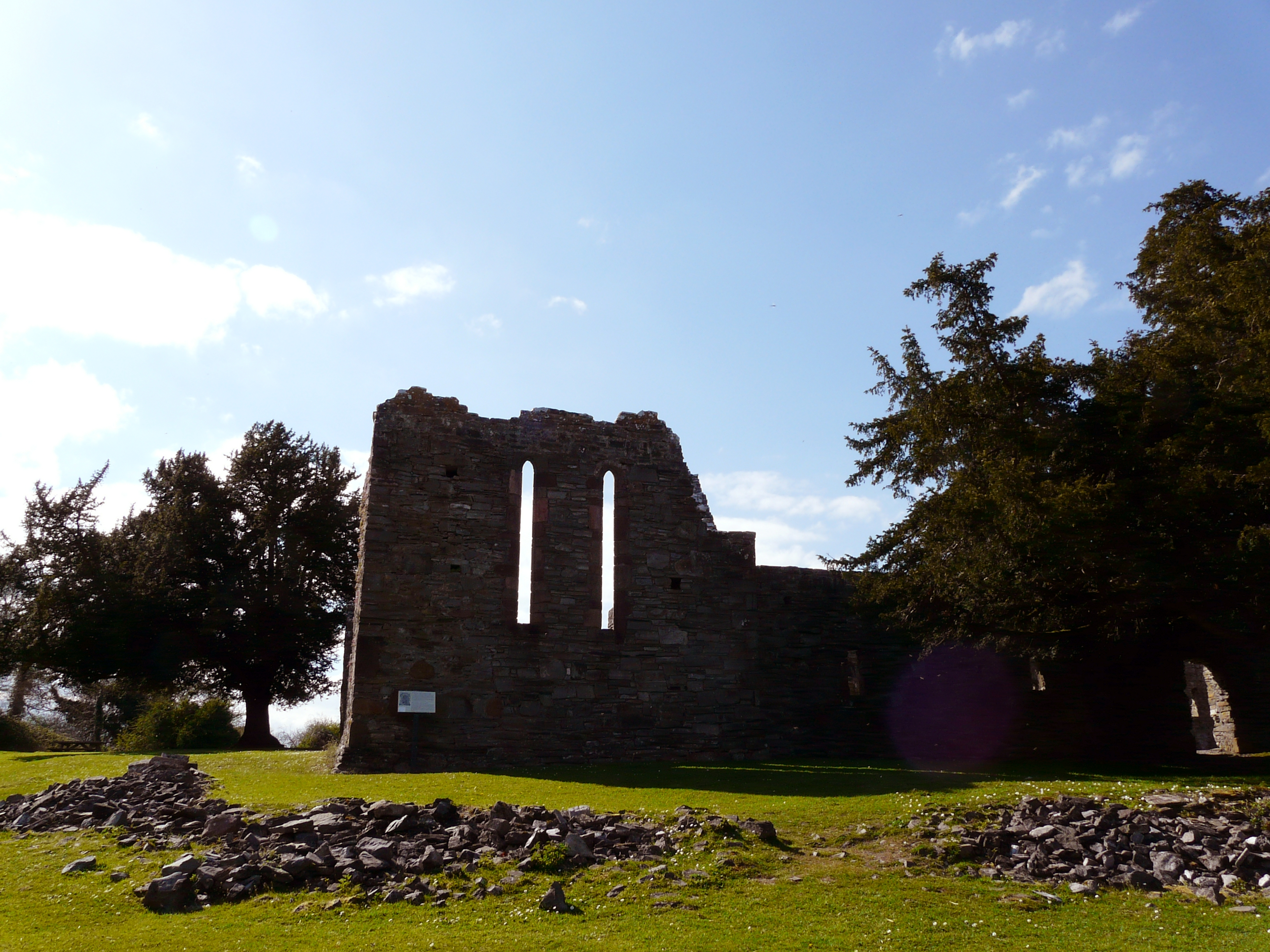
Ruins of the Abbey at Innisfallen island.

It is dated to the late 11th century and is not thought to have been reworked. Its origin is uncertain; it is likely to have been made at Aghadoe Cathedral (est. 939 AD by Finian Lobhar (St. Finian the Leper) and one of the most prominent ecclesiastical foundations in the county), but is recorded in the Irish annals as held at the nearby abbey on Innisfallen island (Faithlinn's island).

The art historian Griffin Murray describes it as "probably broadly contemporary with the earliest stone church on the island and obviously relates to a period of wealth and investment in the monastery at the time. It was of great significance to the community, as ... the staff of office of the abbot and handed on from one abbot to the next. It symbolised the power of the founding saint of the monastery, St Finian, and by association the power of the abbot and the monastery itself."

== Citations ==
=== Sources ===
- Breen, John Rev. "The Innisfallen Crozier". The Catholic Bulletin, Vol. XII, October 1922
- Ó Floinn, Raghnal; Wallace, Patrick (eds), Treasures of the National Museum of Ireland: Irish Antiquities. Dublin: National Museum of Ireland, 2002. ISBN 978-0-7171-2829-7
- Ó Floinn, Raghnal. "A Fragmentary House-Shaped Shrine from Clonard, Co. Meath". Journal of Irish Archaeology, volume 5, 1990. JSTOR 30001620
- Friar O'Sullivan of Muckross Abbey. "Ancient History of the Kingdom of Kerry". Journal of the Cork Historical and Archaeological Society, 1899
- Murray, Griffin. "The Medieval Treasures of County Kerry". Tralee: Kerry County Museum, 2010. ISBN 978-0-956-5714-0-3
- Murray, Griffin. "Insular-type crosiers: their construction and characteristics". Making and Meaning in Insular Art: Proceedings of the Fifth International Conference on Insular Art, 2007
- "Proceedings and Papers". The Journal of the Royal Society of Antiquaries of Ireland, Fifth Series, Volume 1, No. 8, 1891. JSTOR 25507834
- Thickpenny, Cynthia (ed.). Peopling Insular Art: Practice, Performance, Perception. Glasgow: Oxbow Books, 2020. ISBN 1-789-2545-4-X
- Young, Susan. The Work of Angels. Masterpieces of Celtic Metalwork, 6th—9th Centuries AD. London: British Museum, 1989. ISBN 978-02927-9058-2
