= The Consonants at Law - Sigma vs. Tau, in the Court of the Seven Vowels =

The Consonants at Law - Sigma vs. Tau, in the Court of the Seven Vowels is an essay attributed to Lucian, and appearing in the Loeb Classical Library edition of the Works of Lucian. However the edition notes that it is "probably not by Lucian, but much later than his time", Lucian having died in 180 CE. The content of the essay is a mock legal prosecution where the Greek letter Sigma petitions the court to sentence the Greek letter Tau to death by crucifixion:

"Men weep, and bewail their lot, and curse Cadmus with many curses for introducing Tau into the family of letters; they say it was his body that tyrants took for a model, his shape that they imitated, when they set up structures on which men are crucified. Stauros (cross) the vile engine is called, and it derives its vile name from him. Now, with all these crimes upon him, does he not deserve death, nay, many deaths? For my part I know none bad enough but that supplied by his own shape — that shape which he gave to the gibbet named stauros after him by men".
