= John Mangan (bishop) =

Roman-catholic bishop

- Bishop of Ardfert and Aghadoe
- Church: Catholic Church
- Diocese: Diocese of Ardfert and Aghadoe
- In office: 8 July 1904 – 1 July 1917
- Predecessor: John Coffey
- Successor: Charles O'Sullivan

Orders
- Ordination: 1 July 1877
- Consecration: 18 September 1904 by Thomas Fennelly

Personal details
- Born: 8 February 1853 Listowel, County Kerry, United Kingdom of Great Britain and Ireland
- Died: 1 July 1917 (aged 64) Killarney, County Kerry, United Kingdom of Great Britain and Ireland

John Mangan (8 February 1853, Listowel – 1 July 1917, Killarney) was an Irish Roman Catholic bishop.

McRedmond was educated at St Patrick's College, Maynooth and ordained in 1877. He received the degree of Doctor of Divinity (DD). He served for a few years in the Liverpool Mission; after which he was a teacher at St Michael’s College, Listowel. He was the parish priest of Glengariff, then Archdeacon of Aghadoe, and Vicar-General of Kerry. He was Bishop of Ardfert and Aghadoe from 1904 until his death.

Catholic Church titles
Preceded by John Coffey	Roman Catholic Bishop of Ardfert and Aghadoe; 1904–1917	Succeeded by Charles O'Sullivan
