= Michael O'Brien (bishop) =

Roman-catholic bishop

- Bishop of Ardfert and Aghadoe
- Church: Catholic Church
- Diocese: Diocese of Ardfert and Aghadoe
- In office: 20 June 1927 – 4 October 1952
- Predecessor: Charles O'Sullivan
- Successor: Denis Moynihan

Orders
- Ordination: 23 June 1901
- Consecration: 24 July 1927 by John Harty

Personal details
- Born: 31 March 1876 Ardcanaght (west of Castlemaine), County Kerry, United Kingdom of Great Britain and Ireland
- Died: 4 October 1952 (aged 76) Killarney, County Kerry, Republic of Ireland

Michael O'Brien, DD (b Ardconnell 31 March 1876; d Killarney 4 October 1952) was an Irish Roman Catholic Bishop in the mid 20th century.

O'Brien was educated at St Patrick's College, Maynooth and ordained in 1901. He was Bishop of Ardfert and Aghadoe from 1927 until his death.
