= Tau =

Nineteenth letter in the Greek alphabet

Tau (/ˈtaʊ, ˈtɔː, ˈtɒ/; uppercase Τ, lowercase τ or τ; Greek: ταυ [taf]) is the nineteenth letter of the Greek alphabet, representing the voiceless dental or alveolar plosive IPA: [t]. In the system of Greek numerals, it has a value of 300.

The name in English is pronounced /taʊ/ or /tɔː/, and in Greek it is [taf]. This is because the pronunciation of the combination of Greek letters αυ can have the pronunciation of either [ai], [av] or [af], depending on what follows and if a diaeresis is present on the second vowel or an accent mark is present on the first vowel in Greek orthography.

Greek Tau was derived from the Phoenician letter taw (𐤕). Letters that arose from tau include Latin T and Cyrillic Te (Т, т).

== Modern usage ==
The lower-case letter τ is used as a symbol for:

- Specific tax amount

=== Biology ===
- The expressed period of the freerunning rhythm of an animal, i.e., the length of the daily cycle of an animal when kept in constant light or constant darkness
- The dose interval in pharmacokinetics
- The core variable in general tau theory
- Tau in biochemistry, a protein associated with microtubules and implicated in neurodegenerative diseases such as Alzheimer's disease, some forms of frontotemporal lobar degeneration, and chronic traumatic encephalopathy

=== Mathematics ===
- Divisor function in number theory, also denoted d or σ_{0} (Note: The date given on the source is after that of the archive. This is because the original publishing date is unknown, so the latest update date is stated instead.)
- Ramanujan tau function
- Golden ratio (1.618...), although φ (phi) is more common
- Kendall tau rank correlation coefficient in statistics
- Stopping time in stochastic processes. (Note: The archived version of this source may take a few minutes to render the TeX math codes properly.)
- Tau, the ratio of the circumference to the radius of a circle, which is equal to 2×π (6.28318...).
- Tau functions, several
- Torsion of a curve in differential geometry
- Translation in Euclidean geometry (although the Latin letter T is used more often)
- The Prouhet–Thue–Morse constant
- The Lanczos tau-method of computing polynomial approximate solutions of differential equations

=== Physics ===
- Proper time in relativity
- Shear stress in continuum mechanics
- The lifetime of a spontaneous emission process
- Tau, an elementary particle in particle physics
- Tau in astronomy is a measure of optical depth, or how much stellar radiation (e.g. sunlight) cannot penetrate a region
- In the physical sciences, tau is sometimes used as time variable, to avoid confusing t as temperature
- Time constant (also relaxation time) of any system, such as an RC circuit
- Torque, the rotational force in mechanics
- The symbol for tortuosity in hydrogeology
- In thermal physics, the symbol for the characteristic energy τ = kT

== Symbolism ==
- In ancient times, tau was used as a symbol for life or resurrection, whereas the eighth letter of the Greek alphabet, theta, was considered the symbol of death.
- In Biblical times, the taw was put on men to distinguish those who lamented sin, although newer versions of the Bible have replaced the ancient term taw with mark (Ezekiel 9:4) or signature (Job 31:35). Its original sound value is a voiceless alveolar plosive, IPA /t/
- The symbolism of the cross was connected not only to the letter chi but also to tau, the equivalent of the last letter in the Phoenician and Old Hebrew alphabets, and which was originally cruciform in shape; see Cross of Tau.
- An essay written around 160 AD, attributed to Lucian, a mock legal prosecution called The Consonants at Law - Sigma vs. Tau, in the Court of the Seven Vowels, contains a reference to the cross attribution. Sigma petitions the court to sentence Tau to death by crucifixion, saying:
  Men weep, and bewail their lot, and curse Cadmus with many curses for introducing Tau into the family of letters; they say it was his body that tyrants took for a model, his shape that they imitated, when they set up structures on which men are crucified. Stauros (cross) the vile engine is called, and it derives its vile name from him. Now, with all these crimes upon him, does he not deserve death, nay, many deaths? For my part I know none bad enough but that supplied by his own shape — that shape which he gave to the gibbet named stauros after him by men
- Tau is usually considered as the symbol of Franciscan orders due to St. Francis' love for it, symbol of the redemption and of the Cross. Almost all Franciscan churches have painted a tau with two crossing arms, both with stigmata, the one of Jesus and the other of Francis; members of the Secular Franciscan Order usually wear a wooden τ in a string with three knots around the neck
- The title and symbol of "Tau" is used by neo-Gnostic bishops as it has some symbolism in many of the modern branches of Gnosticism.
- For the unofficial astronomical symbol of Saturn’s moon of Titan, a ringed tau is connected to the crook of Saturn.

== Unicode ==
For the Greek and Coptic letter tau:

- U+03A4 Τ GREEK CAPITAL LETTER TAU (&Tau;)
- U+03C4 τ GREEK SMALL LETTER TAU (&tau;)
- U+2CA6 Ⲧ COPTIC CAPITAL LETTER TAU
- U+2CA7 ⲧ COPTIC SMALL LETTER TAU
- U+1D6BB 𝚻 MATHEMATICAL BOLD CAPITAL TAU (Note: The mathematical characters are used only in math. Stylized Greek text should be encoded using the normal Greek letters, with markup and formatting to indicate text style.)
- U+1D6D5 𝛕 MATHEMATICAL BOLD SMALL TAU
- U+1D6F5 𝛵 MATHEMATICAL ITALIC CAPITAL TAU
- U+1D70F 𝜏 MATHEMATICAL ITALIC SMALL TAU
- U+1D72F 𝜯 MATHEMATICAL BOLD ITALIC CAPITAL TAU
- U+1D749 𝝉 MATHEMATICAL BOLD ITALIC SMALL TAU
- U+1D769 𝝩 MATHEMATICAL SANS-SERIF BOLD CAPITAL TAU
- U+1D783 𝞃 MATHEMATICAL SANS-SERIF BOLD SMALL TAU
- U+1D7A3 𝞣 MATHEMATICAL SANS-SERIF BOLD ITALIC CAPITAL TAU
- U+1D7BD 𝞽 MATHEMATICAL SANS-SERIF BOLD ITALIC SMALL TAU

== See also ==
- Greek letters used in mathematics, science, and engineering
