= Charles O'Sullivan =

Roman Catholic bishop

- Bishop of Ardfert and Aghadoe
- Church: Catholic Church
- Diocese: Diocese of Ardfert and Aghadoe
- In office: 10 November 1917 – 29 January 1927
- Predecessor: John Mangan
- Successor: Michael O'Brien

Orders
- Ordination: 6 July 1884
- Consecration: 27 January 1918 by John Harty

Personal details
- Born: 22 August 1858 Ballyfinnane (north of Firies), County Kerry, United Kingdom of Great Britain and Ireland
- Died: 29 January 1927 (aged 68) Killarney, County Kerry, Irish Free State, British Empire

Charles O'Sullivan (22 August 1858, Ballyfinnane – 29 January 1927, Killarney) was an Irish Roman Catholic bishop.

O'Sullivan was educated at St Patrick's College, Maynooth and ordained in 1884. He received the degree of Doctor of Divinity (DD). He was Bishop of Ardfert and Aghadoe from 1917 until his death.

Catholic Church titles
Preceded by John Mangan	Roman Catholic Bishop of Ardfert and Aghadoe; 1917–1927	Succeeded by Michael O'Brien
