= John Coffey (bishop) =

Roman-catholic bishop

- Bishop of Ardfert and Aghadoe
- Church: Catholic Church
- Diocese: Ardfert and Aghadoe
- In office: 27 August 1889 – 14 April 1904
- Predecessor: Andrew Higgins
- Successor: John Mangan

Orders
- Ordination: 6 June 1865
- Consecration: 10 November 1889 by Thomas Croke

Personal details
- Born: 10 January 1836 County Kerry, United Kingdom of Great Britain and Ireland
- Died: 14 April 1904 (aged 68) County Kerry, United Kingdom of Great Britain and Ireland

John Coffey, DD (b and d County Kerry 10 January 1836; 14 April 1904) was an Irish Roman Catholic Bishop in the late nineteenth and early 20th centuries.

Coffey was educated at St Patrick's College, Maynooth and ordained in 1865. He was Bishop of Ardfert and Aghadoe from 1889 until his death. He is buried at St Mary's Cathedral, Killarney.
