= Clonmacnoise Crozier =

11th-century Irish crozier

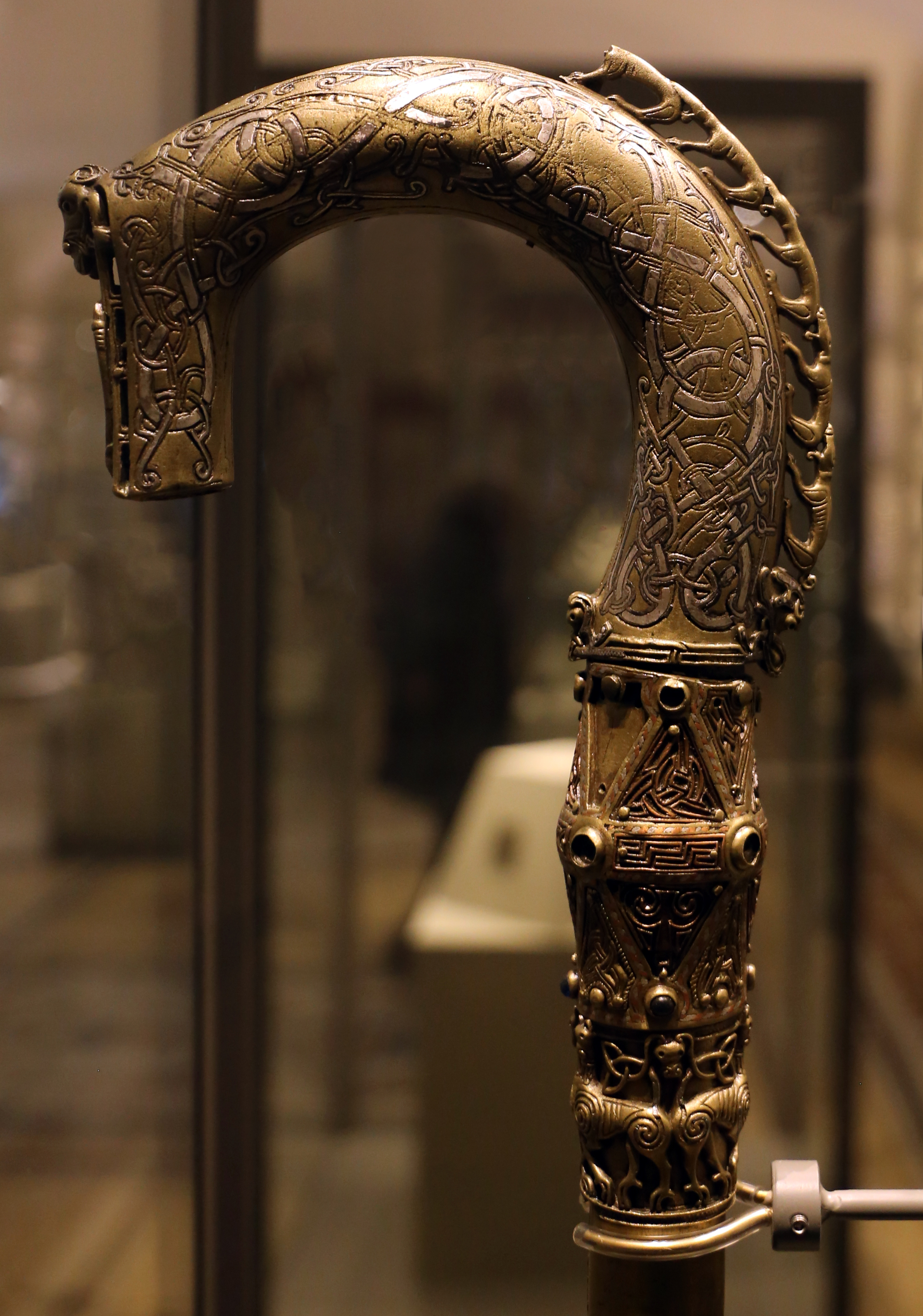
- Upper parts of the crozier
- Material: Wood, copper alloy, silver, niello, glass and enamel
- Size: Height: 97 cm (38 in); Width (max): 13.5 cm (5.3 in)
- Created: Late 11th century; Refurbished in the 14th or 15th centuries
- Discovered: Late 18th or early 19th century Clonmacnoise, County Offaly, Ireland
- Present location: National Museum of Ireland – Archaeology, Kildare Street, Dublin
- Identification: R2988

The Clonmacnoise Crozier is a late-11th-century Insular crozier that would have been used as a ceremonial staff for bishops and mitred abbots. Its origins and medieval provenance are unknown. It was likely discovered in the late 18th or early 19th century in the monastery of Clonmacnoise in County Offaly, Ireland. The crozier has two main parts: a long shaft and a curved crook. Its style reflects elements of Viking art, especially the snake-like animals in figure-of-eight patterns running on the sides of the body of the crook, and the ribbon of dog-like animals in openwork (ornamentation with openings or holes) that form the crest at its top. Apart from a shortening to the staff length and the loss of some inserted gems, it is largely intact and is one of the best-preserved surviving pieces of Insular metalwork.

The crozier may have been associated with Saint Ciarán of Clonmacnoise (died c. 549 CE), and was perhaps commissioned by Tigernach Ua Braín (died 1088), Abbot of Clonmacnoise, but little is known of its origin or rediscovery. It was built in two phases: the original 11th-century structure received an addition sometime around the early 15th century. The staff is made from a wooden core wrapped in copper-alloy (bronze) tubes, fixed in place by binding strips, and three barrel-shaped knops (protruding decorative metal fittings). The hook was concurrently but separately constructed before it was placed on top of the staff. The crozier's decorative attachments include the crest and terminal (or "drop") on the crook, and the knops and ferrule on the staff; these components are made from silver, niello, glass and enamel. The hook is further embellished with round blue glass studs and white and red millefiori (glassware) insets.

The antiquarian and collector Henry Charles Sirr, Lord Mayor of Dublin, held the crozier until his collection was acquired by the Royal Irish Academy on his death in 1841. It was transferred to the archaeology branch of the National Museum of Ireland on Kildare Street on the branch's foundation in 1890. The archaeologist Griffin Murray has described the crozier as "one of [the] finest examples of early medieval metalwork from Ireland".

== Function ==
Like all Insular croziers produced between c. 800 and 1200 CE, the Clonmacnoise crozier is in the shape of an open shepherd's crook, a symbol of Jesus as the Good Shepherd leading his flock. Psalm 23 mentions a "rod" and a "staff", and from the 3rd century onwards Christian art often shows the shepherd holding a staff, including the 4th-century Sarcophagus of the Three Shepherds in the Vatican Museums in Rome, and the 6th-century Throne of Maximian at the Archiepiscopal Museum, Ravenna. The distinctive shape of Irish croziers evokes the function of shepherds' crooks in restraining wayward sheep, and according to the art historian Rachel Moss is similar to the crook-headed sticks used by cherubs to grasp vine branches in Bacchic iconography.

Croziers became symbols of status for bishops and abbots when Pope Celestine I linked them to the episcopal office in a 431 letter to bishops in Gaul. By tradition, the first Irish example (lost since 1538) was the "Bachal Isu" (Staff of Jesus) given by God to Saint Patrick. According to the archaeologist A. T. Lucas, the croziers thus acted as "the principal vehicle of [Patrick's] power, a kind of spiritual electrode through which he conveyed the holy energy by which he wrought the innumerable miracles attributed to him". In a 2004 survey, the Clonmacnoise Crozier was one of an estimated twenty (or fewer) largely intact Insular croziers in addition to some sixty fragments.

== Origin and dating ==
The Irish antiquarian George Petrie (d. 1866) was the first to write about the crozier's discovery, and based on his sources placed the find-spot as in the "Temple Ciarán", a now ruined oratory on the grounds of Clonmacnoise monastery, County Offaly. The oratory is said to contain the tomb of the monastery's founder Saint Ciarán of Clonmacnoise (d. c. 549), and he is recorded as having appeared centuries after his death "to smite a would-be raider with his crozier". Petrie recorded that it was found alongside a hoard including a silver chalice dated to 1647, a wine vessel and an arm-shrine or relic of Ciarán's hand, all now lost except for the chalice. (Note: Arm-shrines are reliquaries made of wood and metal shaped as an outstretched forearm and open or clenched hand or fist; they were popular across Europe in the Early Medieval period, though few examples survive.) The objects would have been deposited individually at the burial site during the centuries after Ciarán's death. However, there is no surviving documentary evidence to support Petrie's account of the find spot. The claim seems based on accounts from 1684 and 1739 which mention that a relic of Ciarán's hand had been found there, (Note: For the 1739 account, see Harris, W. (ed.), The whole works of James Ware concerning Ireland, revised and improved, volume 1. Dublin: E. Jones, 1739) while the crozier's style and production technique closely resembles two other contemporary fragmentary croziers sometimes associated with Clonmacnoise; the very similar and so-called Frazer Crozier-head (catalogue number NMI 1899:28) and a crozier-knop in the British Museum. The antiquarian William Frazer wrote in 1891 that the Clonmacnoise Crozier was probably revered as holding a relic of Saint Ciarán. (Note: Like all Irish Early Medieval relic containers, the crozier, including the inner wooden tube, dates from centuries after the saint's death.)

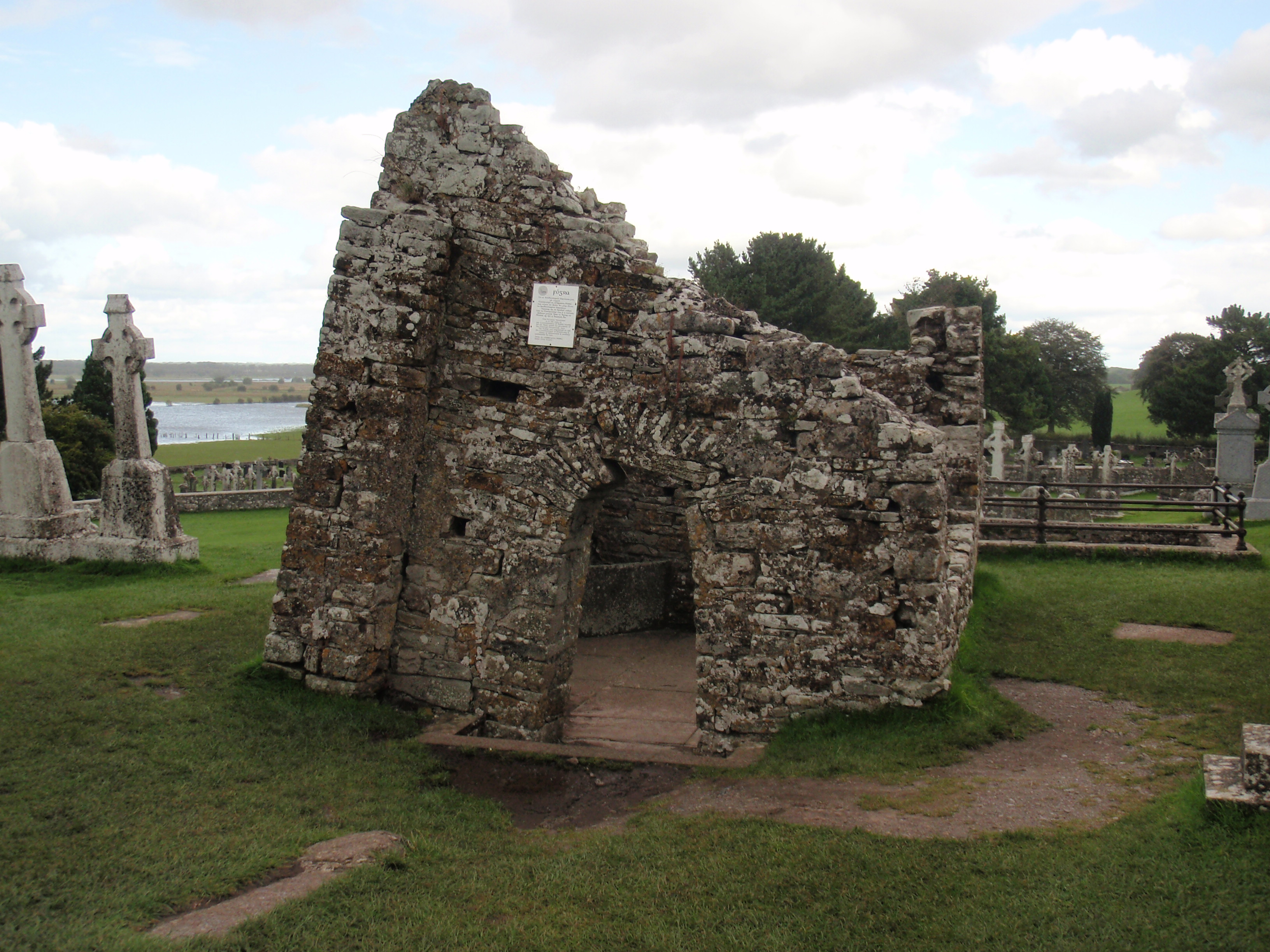
Temple Ciarán in Clonmacnoise monastery, the most likely find-spot for the crozier

Clonmacnoise monastery was founded in 544 by Saint Ciarán in the territory of Uí Maine where an ancient major east–west land route and early medieval political division (the Slighe Mhor) met at the River Shannon. This strategic location helped it become a thriving centre of religion, learning, craftsmanship and trade by the 9th century, and many of the high kings of Tara (Ard Rí) and of Connacht were buried here. Clonmacnoise was largely abandoned by the end of the 13th century. Today the site includes nine ruined churches, a castle, two round towers and many carved stone crosses.

The crozier's late 11th-century dating is based in part on its stylistic resemblance to the Bell Shrine of St. Cuileáin and the early 12th-century Shrine of Saint Lachtin's Arm, as well as the Romanesque elements sometimes found on Insular art of the period. Lucas places it shortly after 1125.

Some historians suggest that the crozier was produced in Dublin, based on the so-called "Dublin school" Hiberno-Ringerike patterns on the crook. It also has zoomorphic designs similar those on the Dublin-manufactured Prosperous Crozier, on the shrine of the Cathach of Saint Columba, which also contains stylistic resemblances to Dublin metalwork, in particular with those found during excavations at High Street, Dublin, during 1962 and 1963. None of these links are definitive nor widely accepted. A significant metal workshop is known to have been in operation at Clonmacnoise in the 11th century, and the crozier contains design elements and motifs unique to contemporary objects found on or near the monastery's grounds. These include the confronted lions with intertwined legs on the collar below the top-most knop, which are also present on a high cross in Temple Ciarán.

== Description ==
The crozier is 97 cm (38 in) long (about the length of a walking stick) and the crook 13.5 cm (5.3 in) wide. It was probably once 20 cm longer and had four knops, as with most other intact examples; the losses seem to result from its having been broken apart to make it easier to fold and thus hide from Viking and later Norman invaders. The staff is formed from a wooden core overlaid by metal tubes, and comprises two main sections: the long shaft and the crook. The crook ends in a vertical section called the drop, with a drop-plate on the outward-facing side. The casing on the shaft is attached by binding strips connected to each other by three knops, while a protective copper alloy ferrule comprises the tip of the shaft's base. The shaft and crook cores are made from separate pieces of timber but date from the same period. The crook is fitted with an inner binding strip, crest and drop-plate, each of which was independently made and, having no structural function, are purely decorative.

It was built in two phases: the early 11th-century structure was added to and refurbished in the 14th century, the later additions including the bishop and dragon in the drop-plate, and some of the ornamentation on the upper knop. The first phase is designed in the Insular style, and contains animal ornament, interlace and Celtic art patterns. Several of the decorations are influenced by the late 10th-century Ringerike and 11th-century Urnes styles of Viking art, both of which are characterised by band-shaped animals (often snakes, dogs and birds), acanthus-leaf foliage, crosses and spirals, and was adapted in Ireland via direct contact and contemporary Anglo-Saxon art from Southern England. Moss describes the crozier as among the finest of the Irish Ringerike-influenced objects, along with the Shrine of Miosach and the Cathach (both 11th-century cumdaigh).

Although it has suffered some losses, damage and detrimental repair work, it is in excellent condition overall. The original drop-plate was replaced in the late medieval period. The wood at the end of the crest is decayed, likely due to one of the rivets being exposed, which in turn led to further damage to the structure.

=== Drop ===
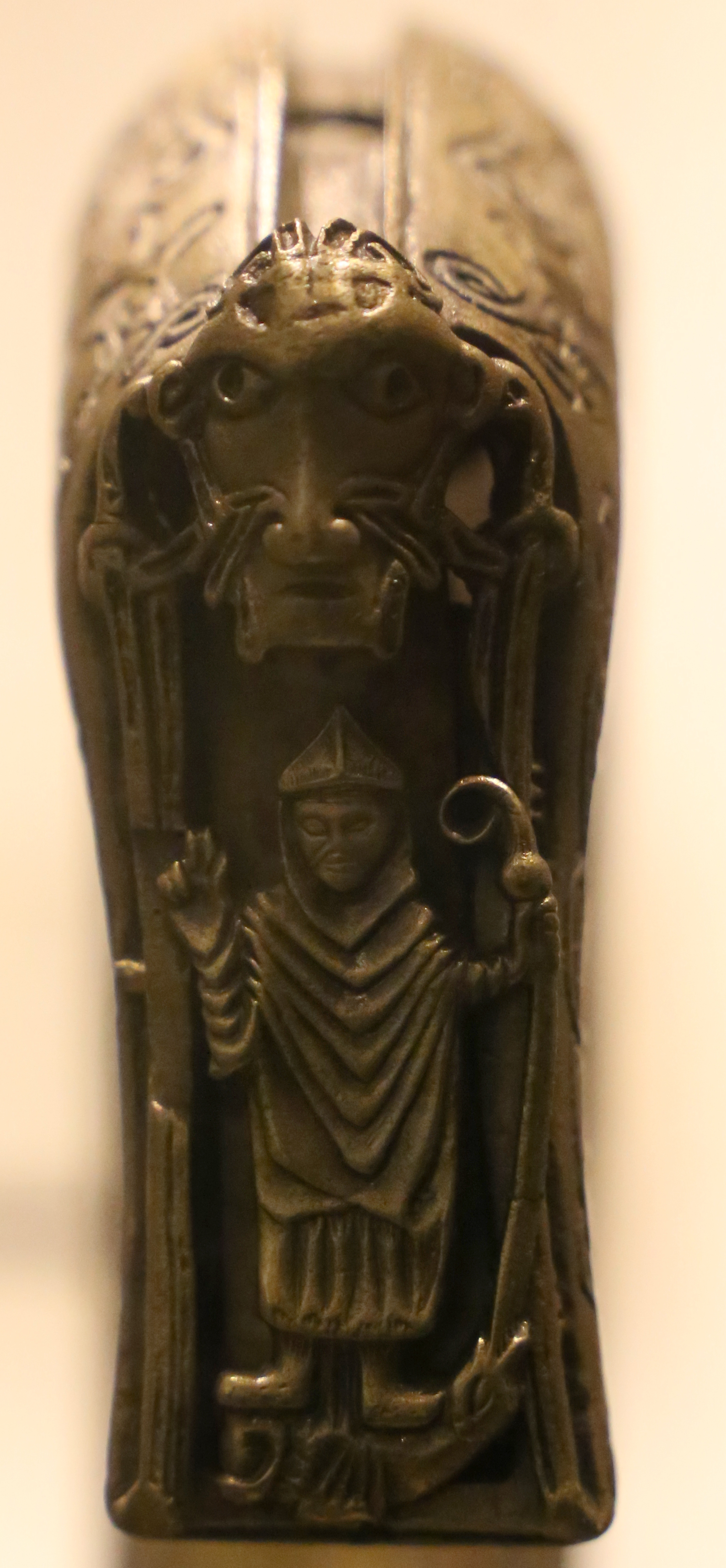
A bishop impaling a dragon with the base of his staff on the drop plate

The original drop was presumably as highly decorated as the knops, but is lost and was replaced sometime during the 14th or 15th centuries. The current plate, like the original, forms a hollow box-like extension that was fixed to the end of the crook. It is cast from copper alloy and consists of a cast figurative insert attached to a plain metal strip. At its top is a looming, grotesque human head in champlevé enamel. Set into the cavity below is a figure added in the 14th or 15th century, who appears to be a bishop or cleric wearing a mitre (a type of bishop's headgear). He has one hand raised in blessing while the other holds a long crozier with a spiral crook, which he uses to impale an animal, probably a dragon, at his feet. De Paor describes the cleric as a generic late-period Insular figure, with "pierced eyes, small ears, a large nose, and [a] heavy mustache and beard".

The positioning of the human figures is similar to the late 9th-century Prosperous Crozier. The only other surviving example of such a figure is in the drop of the River Laune Crozier; presumably other croziers once held similar figures but the components were damaged or removed. It seems likely that the cleric is intended to represent the commemorated saint, thus "making the body of the founder saint visible and active", and conferring the saint's authority to the crozier's current bearer. The copper plate underneath the drop contain enamel double-spiral designs rendered in blue, green and yellows.

As the most visible portion of the crozier, the drops were the obvious focus point for figure art, an element that is, apart from zoomorphism, otherwise almost entirely absent in Insular metalwork. This led to theories in the 19th century that the drops acted as containers for smaller relics of saints, while the metal casing held the saint's original wooden staffs; these claims have been in doubt since the mid-20th century, and there is no evidence to support the theories. An exception is the Lismore Crozier, where two small relics and a linen cloth were found inside the crook during a 1966 refurbishment.

=== Crook ===
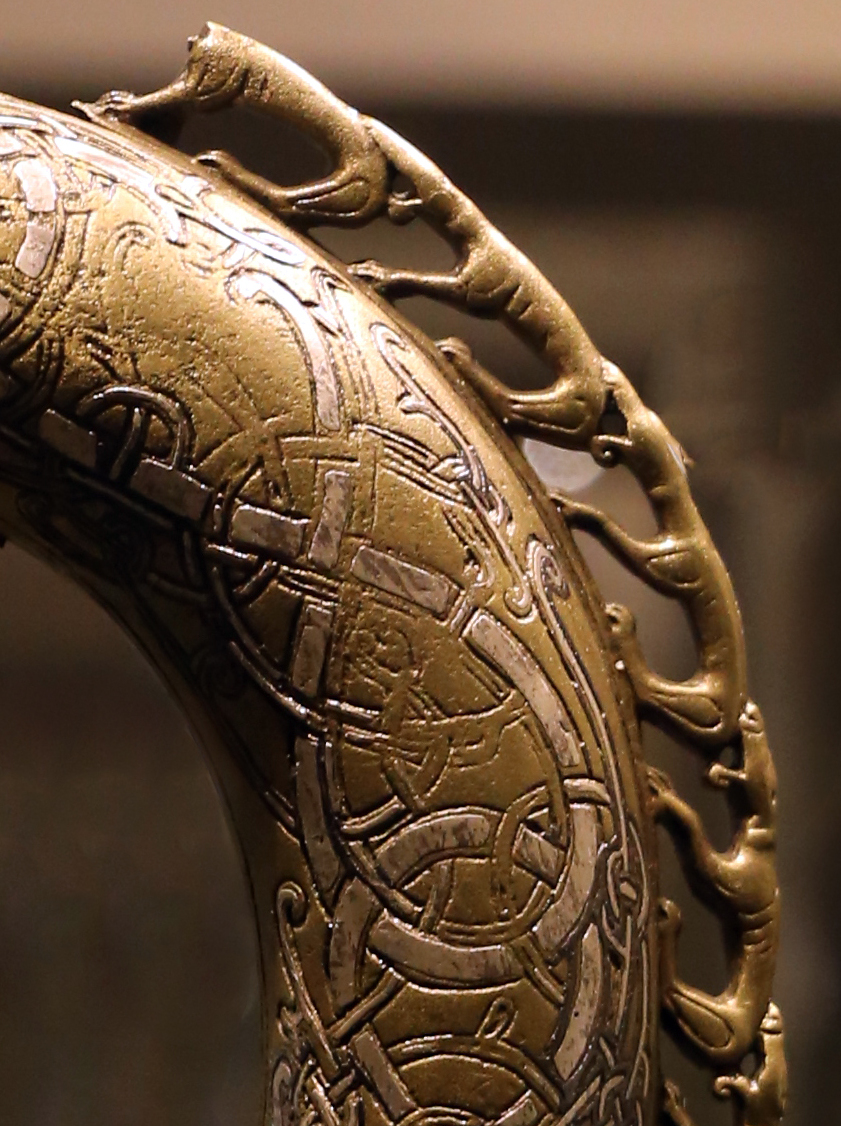
The row of dog-like gripping beasts that form the crest

The crook is 13.5 cm (5.3 in) high, 15.5 cm (6.1 in) wide and has a maximum circumference of 3.7 cm (1.5 in). It is composed of a single piece of wood, encased in copper alloy, with an inner binding and plates for the crest and drop. Each side of the crook is decorated with four or five silver cast zoomorphic snake-like animals in rows of tightly bound figure-eight knots and ribbon-shaped pale coloured bodies that intertwine and loop over each other. Designed in an Irish adaption of the Ringerike style, they are outlined with thin strips of niello that appear as decorative flaps that, according to the archaeologist and art historian Griffin Murray, "spring from their heads and bodies forming knotted vegetal-like designs around them" before terminating in spiral patterns.

The crest is attached to the top of the crook by rivets and nails. Around half of it has broken away, but what remains consists of an openwork row of five crouching dog-like animals that extends from above the joining with the staff to just before the top of the crook – presumably the row once extended to the top of the drop, especially since the lead animal is the most badly damaged and missing its head, while those nearest are also damaged and have missing parts. The animals are forward-looking and positioned end-to-end, and rendered in the Oseberg Style of Viking art. They each appear, in the words of the art historian Máire de Paor, as "grasping with [their] jaws the buttocks of the preceding animal". Similarly, the Frazer Crozier-head contains dog-tooth patterns on the upper part of the crook, but these are thought to be 16th-century additions.

=== Shaft ===
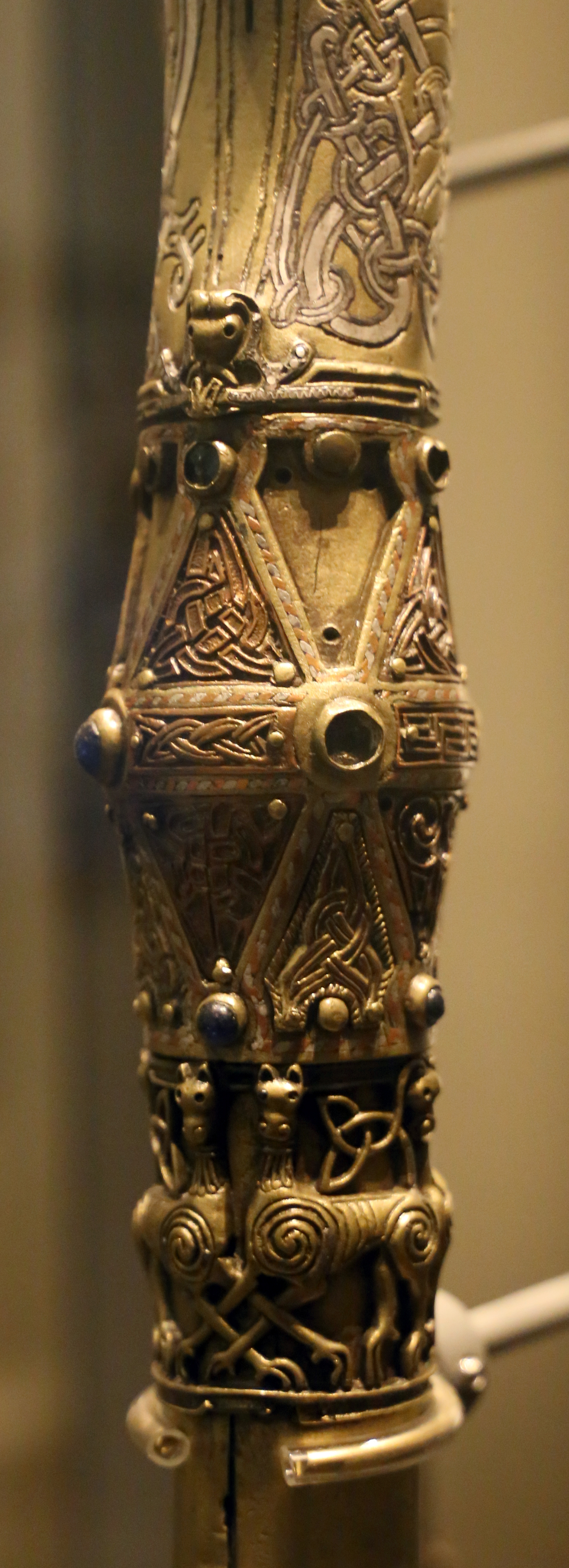
Upper knop decorated with triangular plaques, blue glass studs and interlace

The shaft is formed from a wooden core plated with two copper alloy tubes and narrows after the lowest knop. The tubing was originally sealed by two binding strips on the front which were probably of leather but are now lost, although a portion of a leather membrane between the wood and metal still exists. The shaft contains three large and ornately decorated barrel-shaped and individually cast knops, each of which fully wraps around the staff. They are positioned equally distant on the staff, separated by lengths of bare tubing. Each contains openwork patterns and chased or repoussé (i.e. relief hammered from the back) copper-alloy plates, a feature only otherwise found on the Prosperous Crozier.

The largest and uppermost knop is 7.5 cm (3.0 in) high and has a diameter of 4.8 cm (1.9 in). It is centred by a horizontal band of interlace and champlevé enamelling containing geometric and foliage patterns. It is lined with inserted triangular and rectangular plaques (some of which are missing) between which are blue glass studs. The plaques are in copper and decorated with interlace and have borders lined with strips of twisted copper and silver wire. It contains a 4.2 cm (1.7 in) crest which has been trimmed to hold the base of the crook. The crest below the upper knop is made of copper alloy and contains two pairs of large cat-like animals facing or confronting each other. The animals are rendered in relief and decorated with niello and inlaid silver. They have lion-like manes, upright ears, long necks and taloned tails. Their intertwined legs begin from spirals which develop or knot into triquetra arcs before merging with the corresponding animal on the opposite side. Although usually identified as lions, the figures also bear a resemblance to griffins in an 8th-century Insular knop from Setnes in Norway.

The central knop is 8.8 cm (3.5 in) in height and less decorated than the other two, but has bands of open Ringerike-style interlace made of inlaid silver that form series of knotted patterns. The lower knop measures 6.8 cm (2.7 in) in height and, like the upper knop, is biconical (i.e. of two parts) and contains copper plaques separated by glass studs.

After the lower knop the shaft passes through a free ring and tapers (narrows) into the spiked ferrule (a protective metal-cast foot, here of copper alloy) that forms the crozier's basal point. Unlike the other two Insular examples with surviving ferrules (Lismore and River Laune, both of which have more elaborate and complex endings), it is not cast into the lower knop but is a separate piece.

== Modern provenance ==
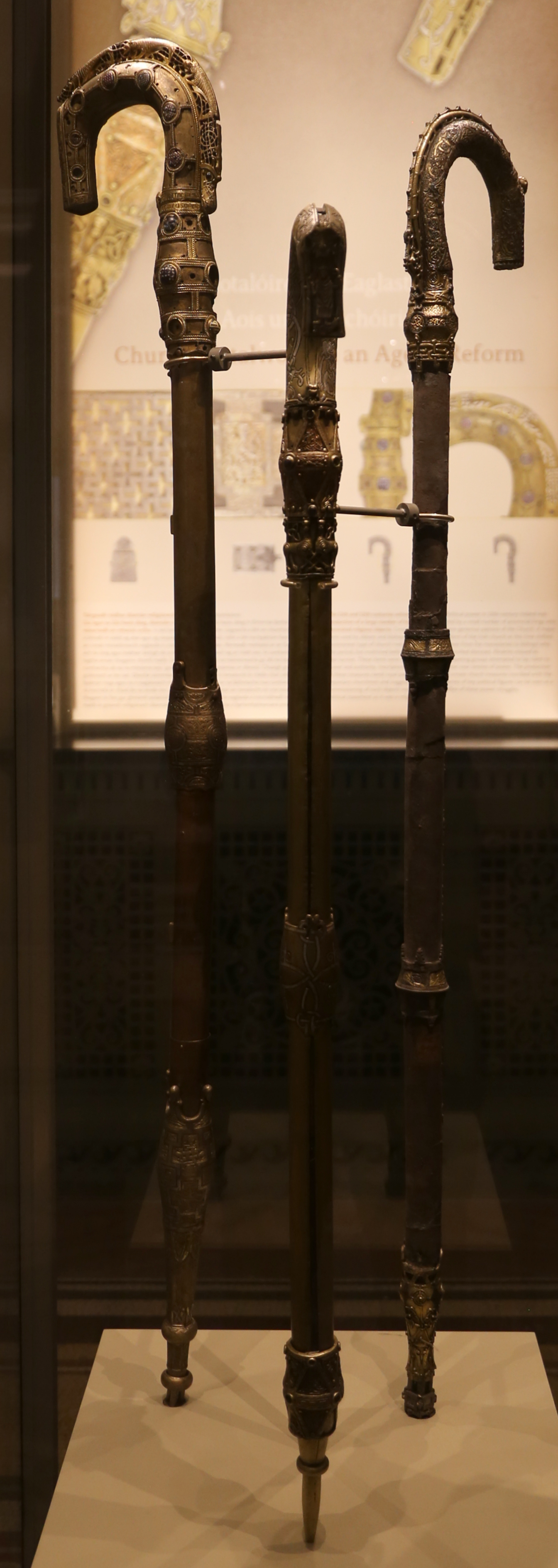
On display with the Lismore (left) and River Laune (right) croziers

The location and year of the crozier's rediscovery is uncertain. Writing in 1821 in his Notes on the history of Clonmacnoise, Petrie said that it had been found "some 30 years ago [...] [in] the tomb of St. Ciaran", placing its finding c. 1790. He continued that other objects discovered in the tomb included a chalice and wine vessel which, according to Petrie "fell into ignorant hands, and were probably deemed unworthy of preservation", indicating that their precious metal was melted and sold for its intrinsic value. The "St Ciaran's tomb" referred to by Petrie is most likely Clonmacnoise's Temple Ciarán, a shrine-chapel on the site.

The crozier was for a period in the collection of the Lord Mayor of Dublin and collector Henry Charles Sirr (1764–1841), although the circumstances of his purchase are unknown. In 1970, the archaeologist Françoise Henry speculated that Sirr "might have obtained it directly or indirectly from the family of its hereditary keepers", but there is no documentary evidence for this. In 1826, a lithograph representation appeared in Picturesque Views of the Antiquities of Ireland, compiled in 1830 by the architect and draughtsman Robert O'Callaghan Newenham, where it was described as having been "dug up 100 years ago".

The crozier is described as an "ancient" and ornamental crozier, which once belonged to the Abbots of Clonmacnoise, in an 1841 catalogue for an exhibition of Sirr's collection at the Rotunda Hospital in Dublin, held shortly after his death. It was acquired at that exhibition by the Royal Irish Academy, and transferred to the National Museum of Ireland, Kildare Street, Dublin, on its founding in 1890. Today it is on permanent display in the Treasury Room, next to the Lismore and River Laune Croziers, where it is catalogued as R 2988. An early 20th-century replica is in the Met Cloisters in New York. Widely considered the most lavish and ornate of the surviving early medieval croziers, it appeared in 2011 in The Irish Times and Royal Irish Academy's list of "A History of Ireland in 100 Objects".

== Gallery ==
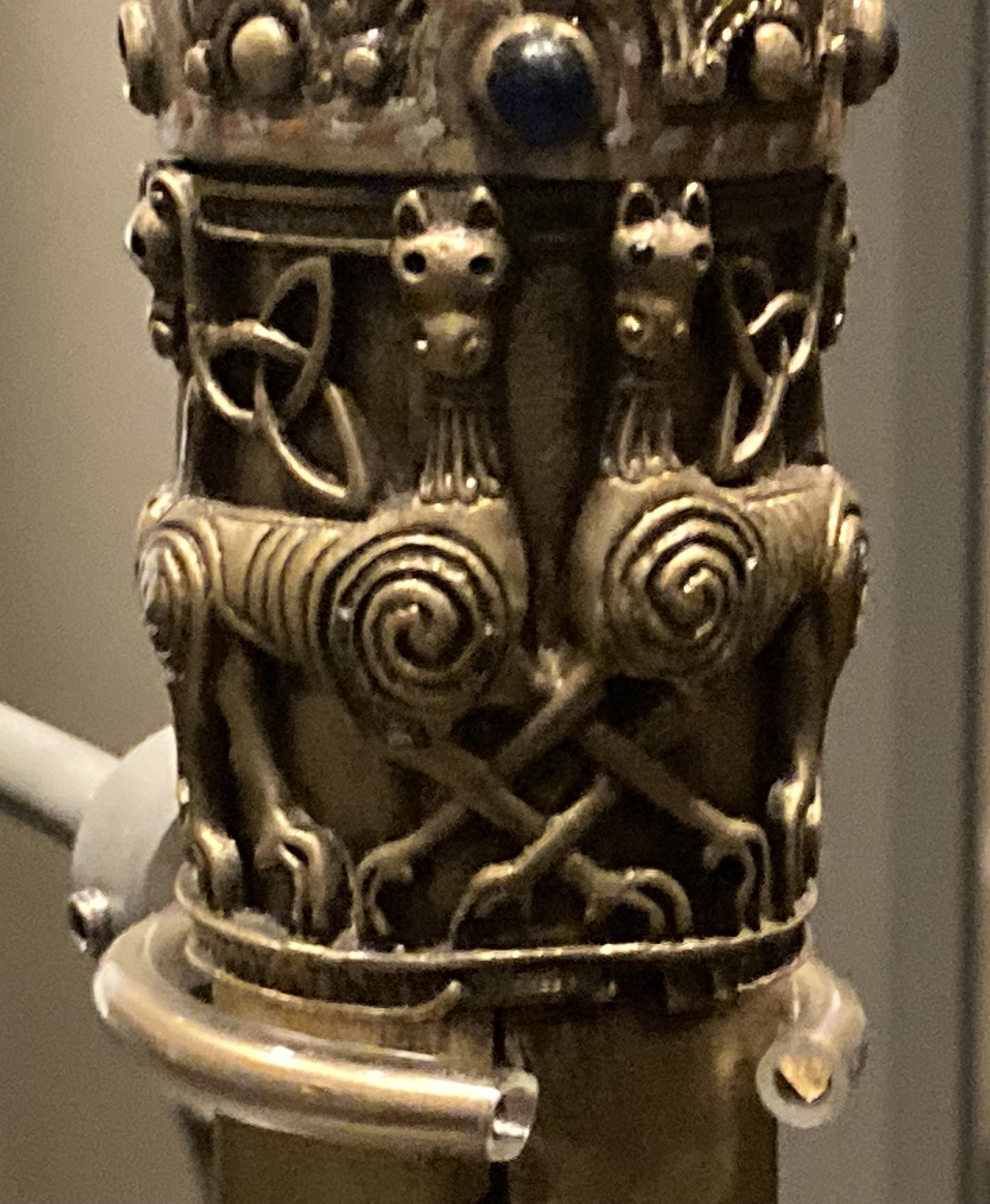
Detail of confronted cat-eared animals (probably intended as lions) on the panel below the upper knop

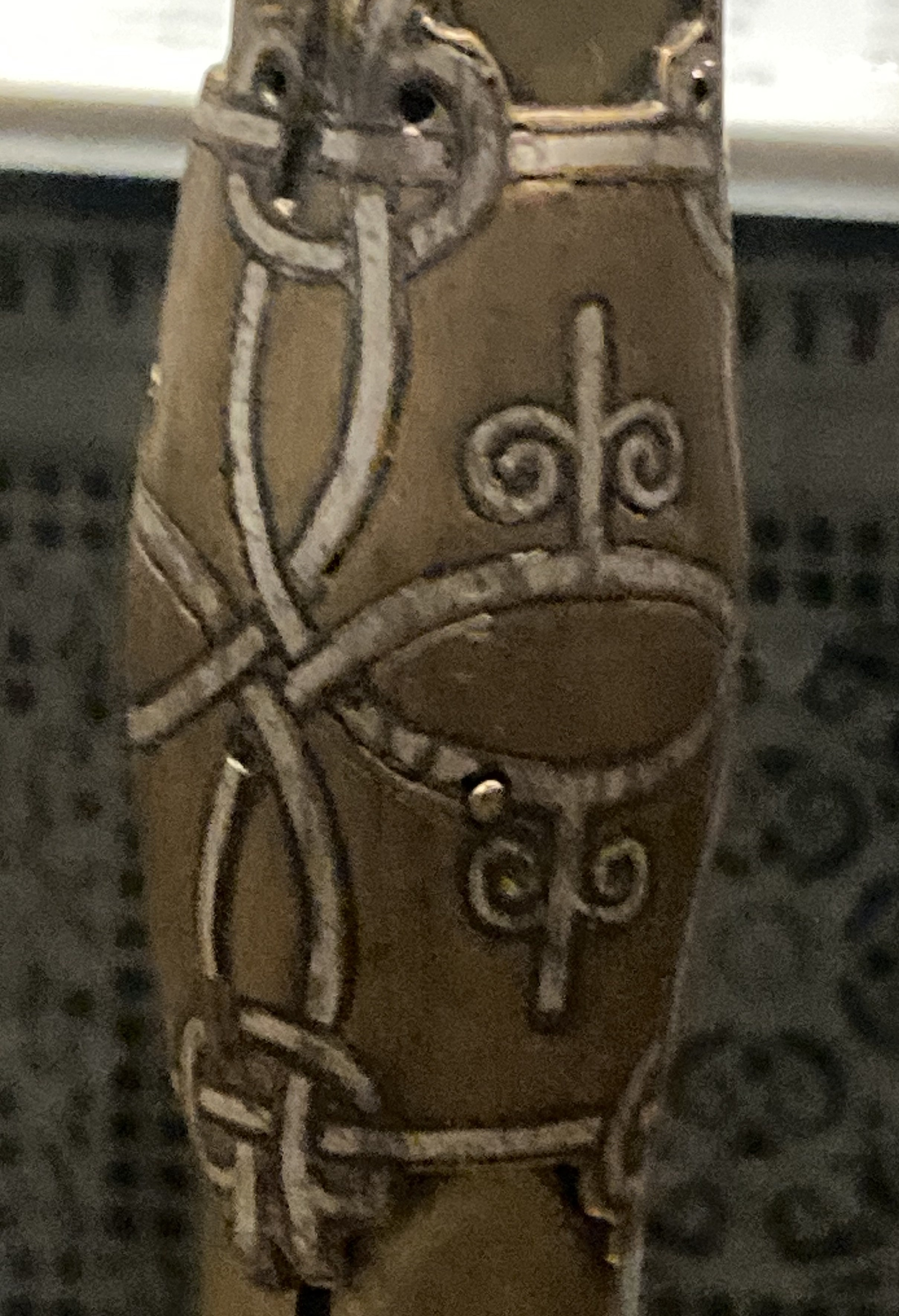
Ringerike designs on the middle knop

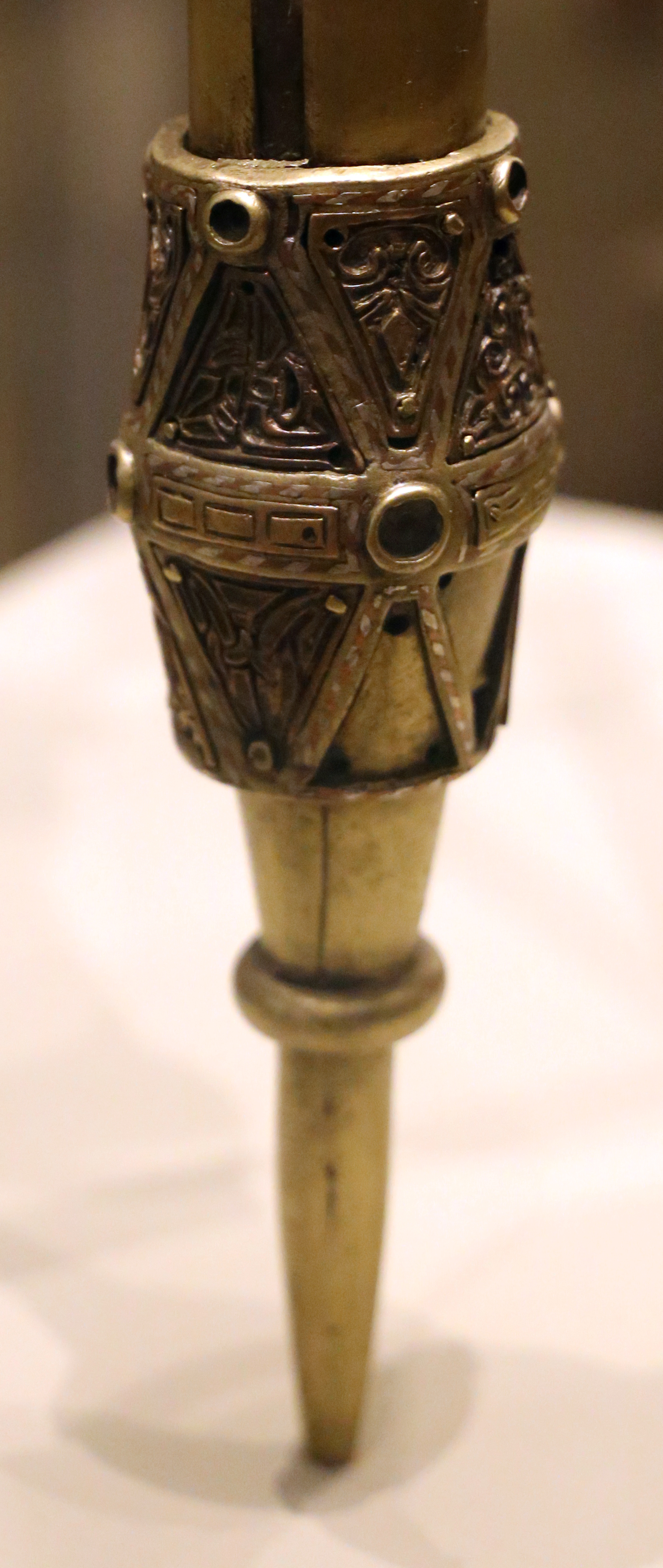
Lower knop and ferrule with loose ring and tapering spike
