= Tău =

Tău may refer to several places in Romania:

- Tău, a village in Roșia de Secaș Commune, Alba County
- Tău, a village in Zau de Câmpie Commune, Mureș County
- Tău (river), a river in Caraș-Severin County
