= Tourist Association of Ukraine =

The Tourist Association of Ukraine (TAU) —- is a Ukrainian public organization of tourism.

The organization was established in April 1998 in Kyiv under the Laws of Ukraine «About Tourism» and «About public associations». The organization is a professional association of tourism enterprises of Ukraine.

TAU brings together leading representatives of tourist industry of Ukraine and actively developing domestic tourism market.

March 2, 2001 noting a significant contribution to the development of the association and for promoting the domestic tourism industry to encourage the development of tourism in Ukraine, support domestic business tourism, create modern tourism industry, and given the international practice involving civic organizations to participate in the development of the tourism industry, Activities Association approved by the Decree of the President of Ukraine №127/2001.
