= Tau function =

Tau function may refer to:

- Tau function (integrable systems), in integrable systems
- Ramanujan tau function, giving the Fourier coefficients of the Ramanujan modular form
- Divisor function, an arithmetic function giving the number of divisors of an integer
