= Lismore, County Waterford =

Town in County Waterford, Ireland

Lismore Irish: Lios Mór
- Town
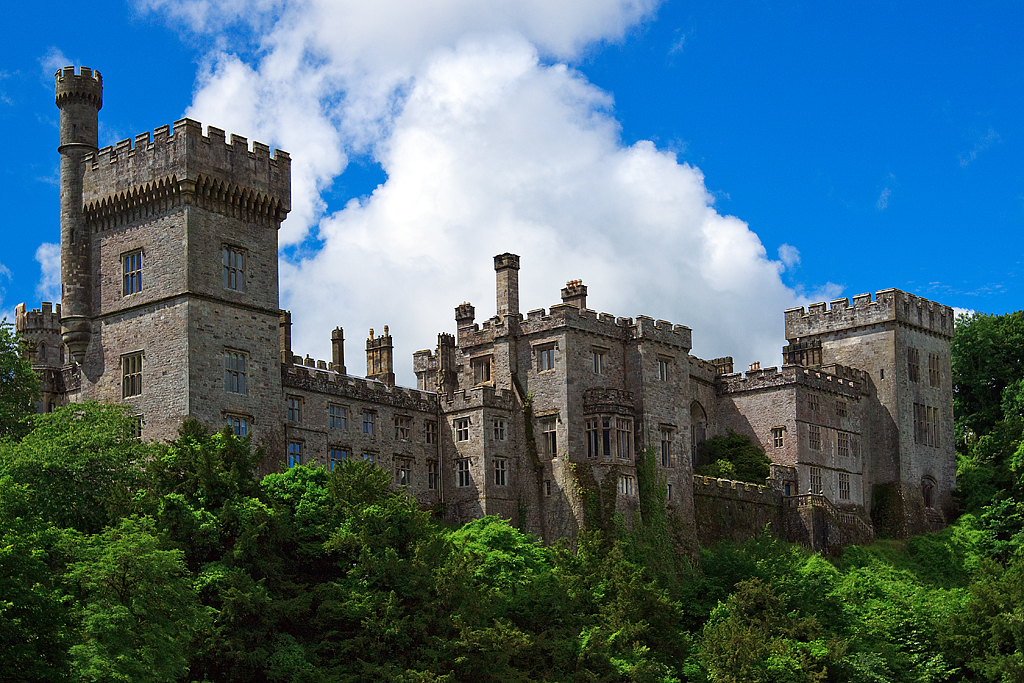
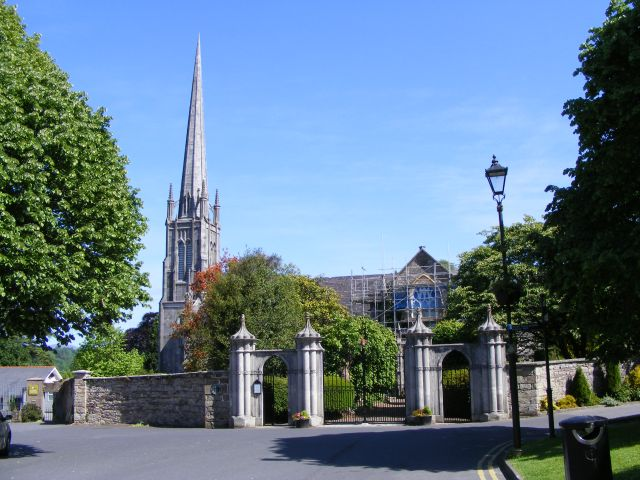
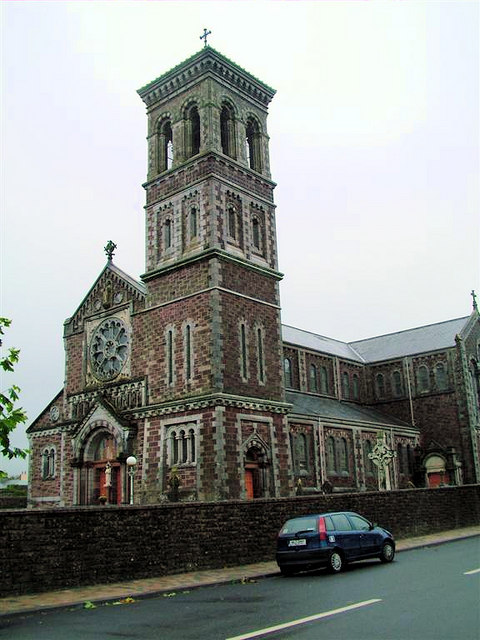
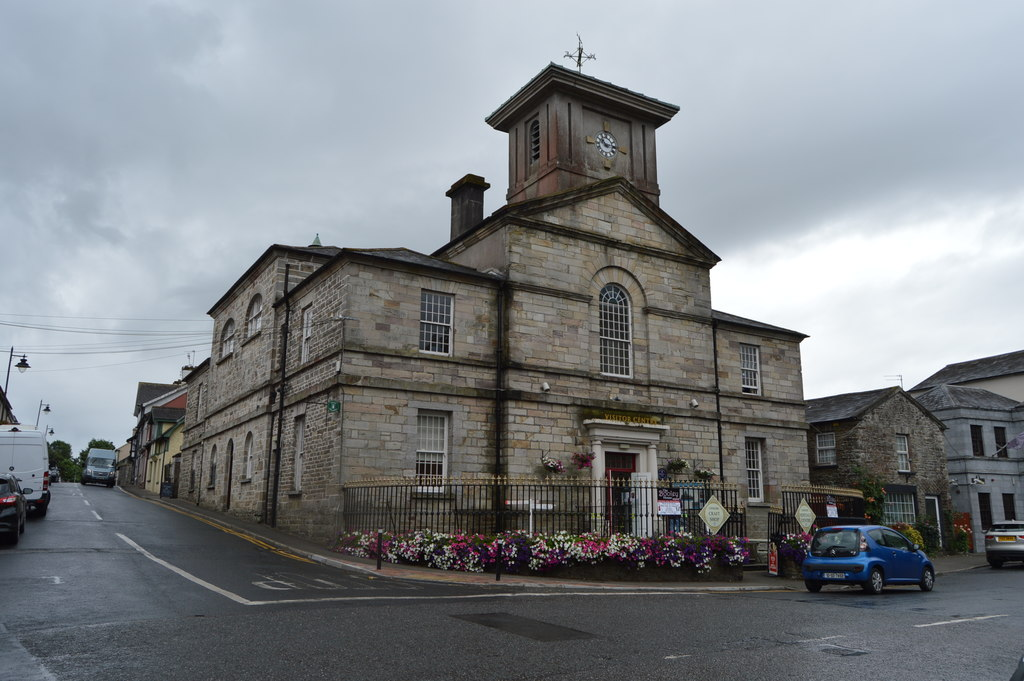
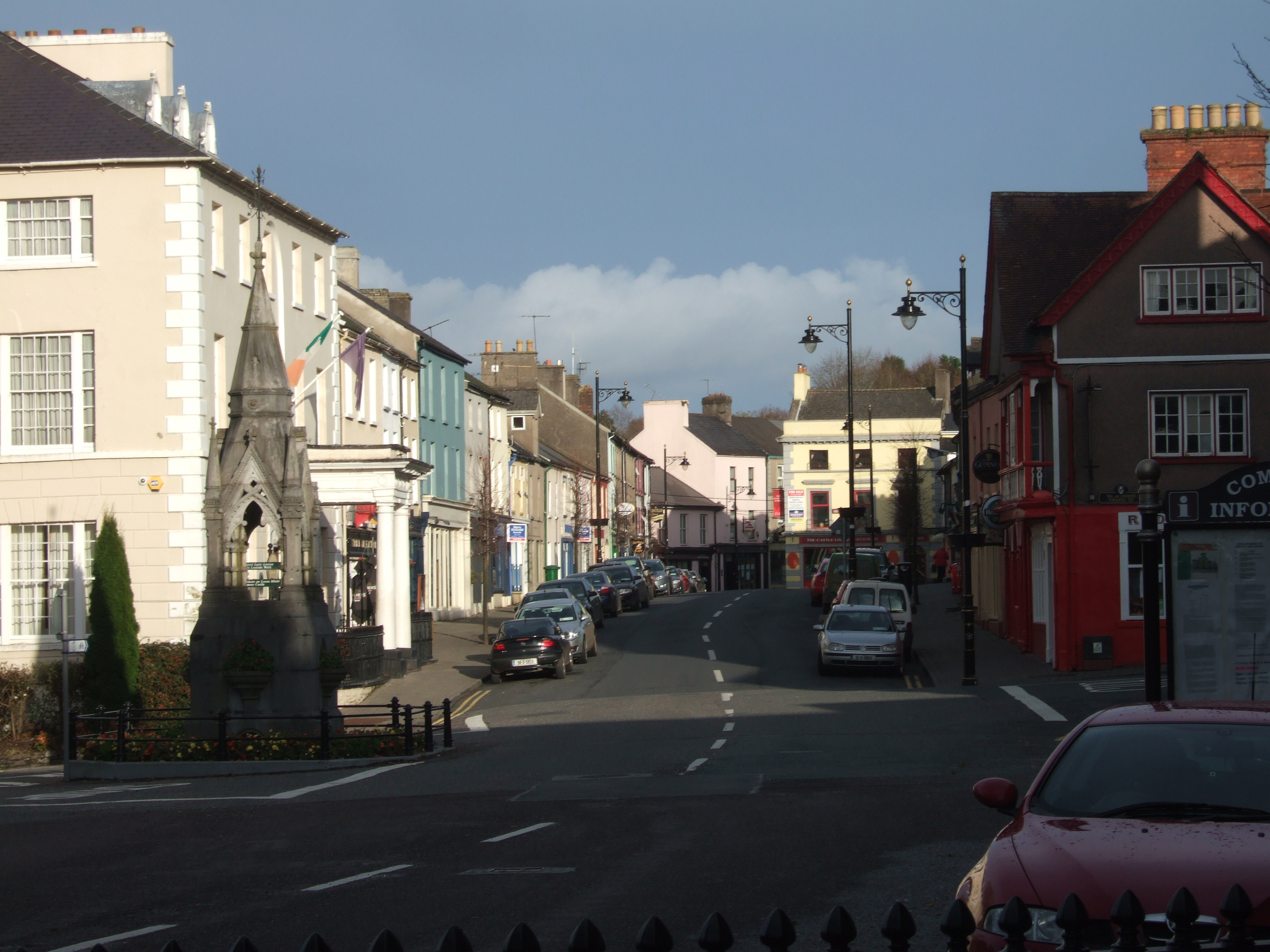
- Lismore Castle Lismore Cathedral St Carthage's Church Lismore Courthouse Town centre

- Seal

- Location in Ireland
- Coordinates: 52°08′12″N 7°55′51″W
- Country: Ireland
- Province: Munster
- County: Waterford
- Elevation: 86 m (282 ft)

Population (2022)
  - Total: 1,347
- Time zone: UTC±0 (WET)
  - Summer (DST): UTC+1 (IST)
- Eircode routing key: P51
- Telephone area code: +353(0)58
- Irish Grid Reference: X045984

Lismore (Irish: Lios Mór, meaning 'great ringfort') is a historic heritage town in County Waterford, in the province of Munster, Ireland. Originally associated with Saint Mochuda of Lismore, who founded Lismore Abbey in the 6th century, the town developed around the medieval Lismore Castle. In 2022, the town had a population of 1,347 people.

As of the 21st century, Lismore supports a rural catchment area, and was designated as a "district service centre" in Waterford County Council's 2011–2017 development plan.

== History ==
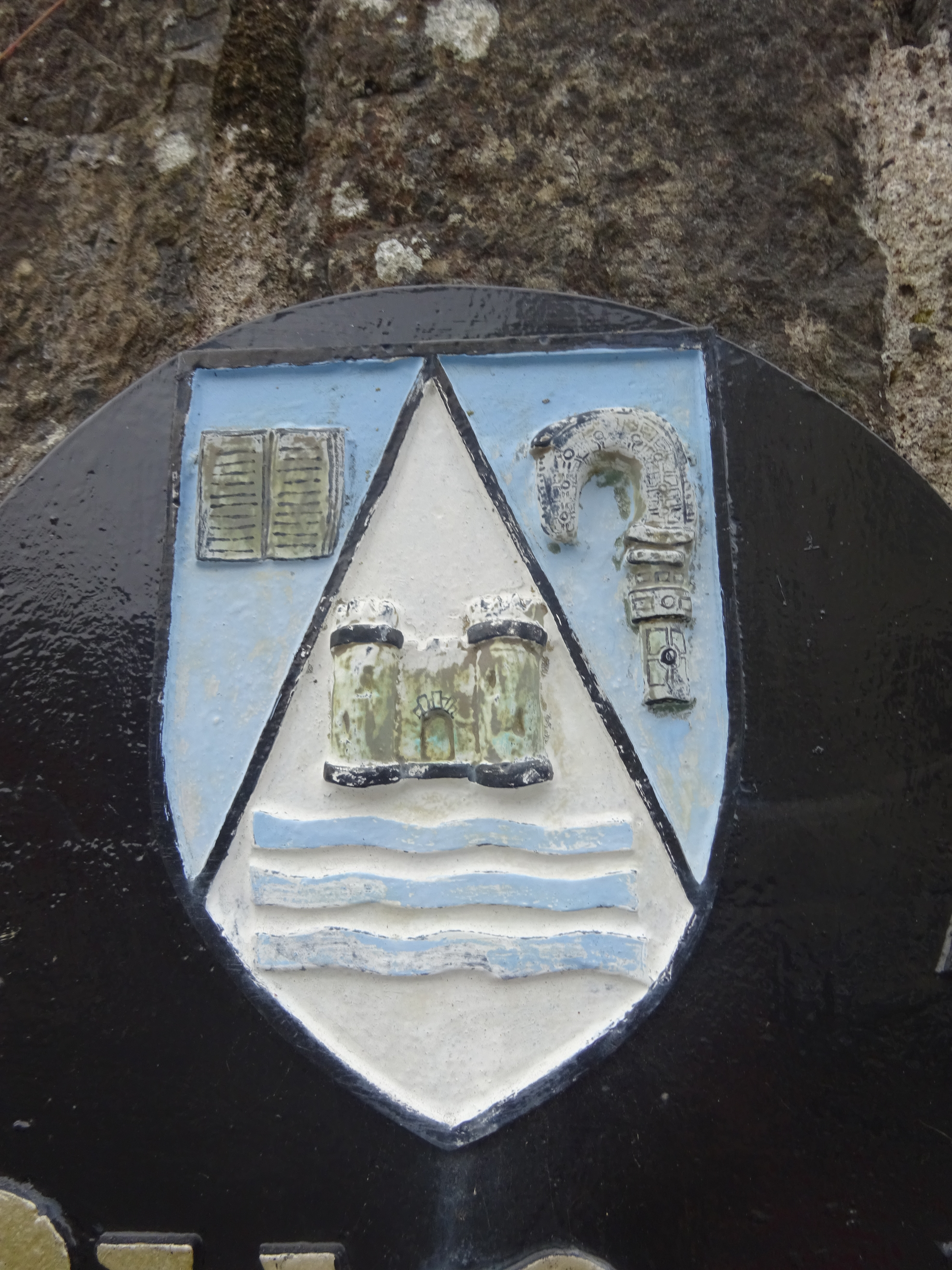
Arms of Lismore on a metal plaque

Founded by Mo Chutu of Lismore, died 637, first abbot of Lismore. The town is renowned for its early ecclesiastical history and the scholarship of Lismore Abbey.

The imposing Lismore Castle, situated on the site of the old monastery since medieval times, lies on a steep hill overlooking the town and the Blackwater valley. It can trace an eight-hundred-year-old history linking the varied historic relations between England and Ireland. Originally built following the arrival of John, Lord of Ireland, in the twelfth century, the castle was a bishop's palace up to the sixteenth century. Subsequently, owned by Sir Walter Raleigh until his demise, it was sold to Richard Boyle, who was created the Earl of Cork in 1620, described by historian R. F. Foster, in Modern Ireland, as an "epitome of Elizabethan adventurer-colonist in Ireland". In 1627 the castle was the birthplace of Robert Boyle (of Boyle's law), known as the "father of modern chemistry", son of the First Earl. Boyle was chased off his lands in Ireland during the Irish Rebellion of 1641, following which his sons recovered the family estates after suppression of the rebellion. The castle remained in the possession of the Boyle family until it passed to the English Dukes of Devonshire in 1753 when Lady Charlotte Boyle, daughter of the 4th Earl of Cork, married the Marquess of Hartington, who succeeded in 1755 as the 4th Duke of Devonshire and was appointed prime minister of Great Britain in 1756.

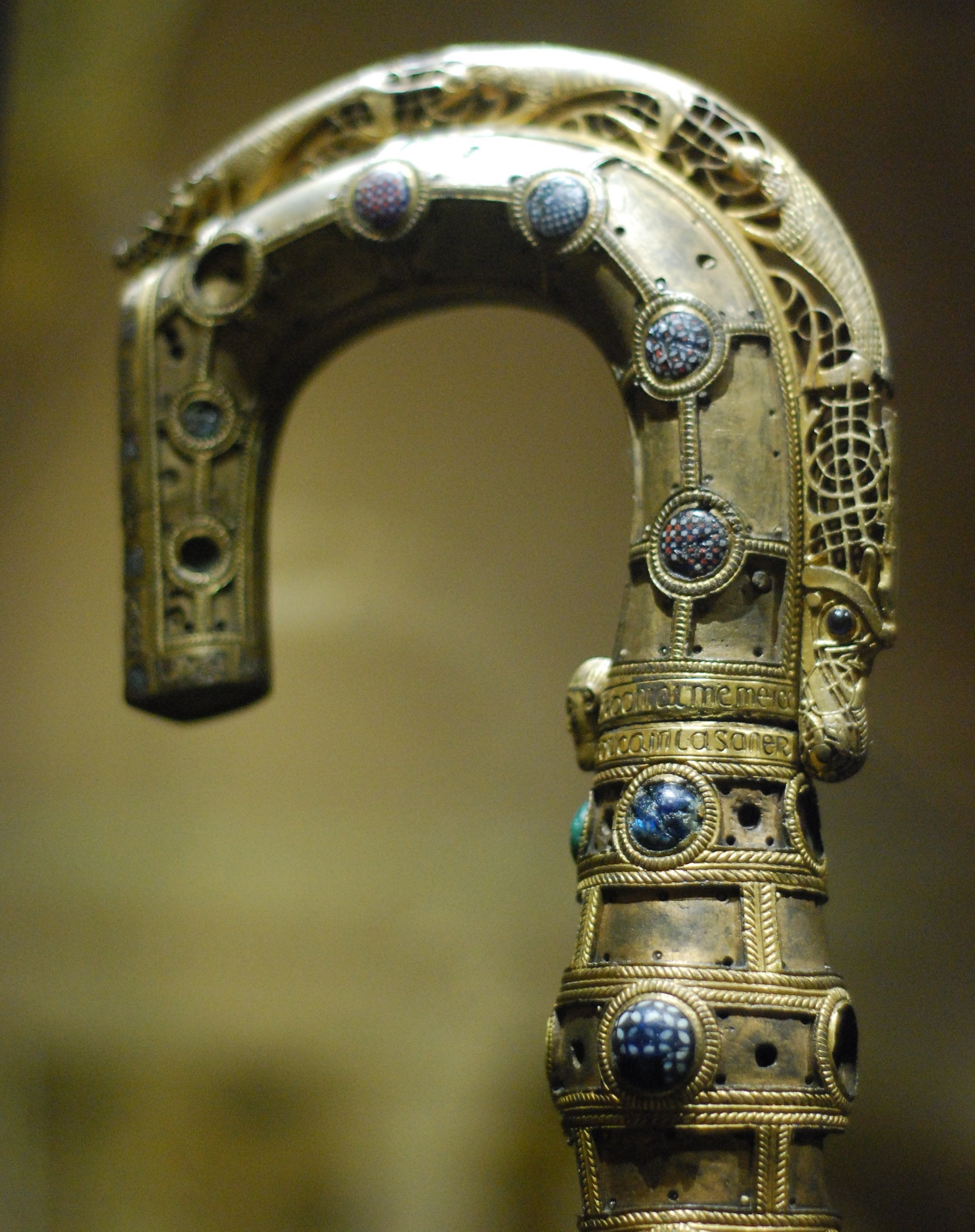
The Lismore Crozier, c. 1100

The Book of Lismore, a compilation of medieval Irish manuscripts mainly relating the lives of Irish saints, notably St Brigid, St Patrick, and St Columba, also contains Acallam na Senórach, a Middle Irish narrative dating to the 12th century, pertaining to the Fenian Cycle. The Book of Lismore and the Lismore Crozier (an enclosure for an episcopal staff, believed to be the venerable oaken staff of the founder of the abbey), were discovered together in 1814 behind a blocked-up doorway in Lismore Castle. Today, the castle continues in the private ownership of the Dukes of Devonshire who open the gardens and parts of the grounds for public access via a changing programme of local arts and education events. The Book of Lismore is currently owned by University College Cork, where it is planned to be displayed, and the Lismore Crozier is in the National Museum of Ireland in Dublin.

The medieval Lismore Cathedral, dedicated to St Carthage, variously damaged and repaired over the centuries, is notable for its architecture and the stained glass window by the English pre-Raphaelite artist, Edward Burne-Jones. It has been a place of worship since the 7th century but the current cathedral was constructed in the 17th century. Lismore Courthouse was completed in 1815.

St Carthage's Church in the town is a Catholic church also dedicated to St Carthage, which has operated since it opened in 1884.

A plaque was erected in the town to commemorate the regular visits made to Lismore by Fred Astaire following an association developed by his sister, Adele Astaire, who was married to Lord Charles Cavendish, son of Victor Cavendish, 9th Duke of Devonshire. A notable resident born in the town who has described her early life in Lismore, is the travel writer and world touring cyclist Dervla Murphy. Another notable resident was George O'Brien, the Irish memoirist, writer, and academic, who was raised by his paternal grandmother in Lismore, described in his memoir The Village of Longing: An Irish Boyhood in the Fifties (1987).

In September 2003, Blackwater Community School opened as an amalgamation of three local schools: Lismore CBS, Presentation Convent, Lismore and St Anne's Secondary School, Cappoquin.

== Location ==
Lismore is in the west of County Waterford, where the N72 road crosses the River Blackwater at the foot of the Knockmealdown Mountains (Irish: Sléibhte Chnoc Mhaoldomhnaigh), the mountain range which divides the counties of Tipperary and Waterford.

Dungarvan is 21 km to the east of Lismore, and Fermoy is 24 km to the west.

== Demographics ==
Historical population
Year	Pop.	±%
1813	1,569	—
1821	2,330	+48.5%
1831	2,894	+24.2%
1841	3,007	+3.9%
1851	2,319	−22.9%
1861	2,085	−10.1%
1871	1,946	−6.7%
1881	1,860	−4.4%
1891	1,632	−12.3%
1901	1,583	−3.0%
1911	1,474	−6.9%
1926	1,363	−7.5%
1936	1,194	−12.4%
1946	1,174	−1.7%
1951	1,089	−7.2%
1956	893	−18.0%
1961	1,069	+19.7%
1966	1,046	−2.2%
1971	1,041	−0.5%
1981	1,119	+7.5%
1986	1,085	−3.0%
1991	1,095	+0.9%
1996	1,095	+0.0%
2002	1,182	+7.9%
2006	1,240	+4.9%
2011	1,369	+10.4%
2016	1,374	+0.4%
2022	1,347	−2.0%

As of the 2022 census, Lismore had a population of 1,347; 84.97% was white Irish, less than 0.25% white Irish traveller, 9.77% other white ethnicities, less than 0.25% black, less than 1% Asian, with 2.25% not stating their ethnicity. In terms of religion the town was 74.1% Catholic, 6.45% other stated religion, 17.30% with no religion, and 2.15% not stated.

== Transport ==
=== Bus transport ===
There have been ongoing improvements to the frequency of the Local Link (formerly known as Déise Link) bus service. A bus shelter was also provided in the town. There are four services a day each way (Mondays to Saturdays inclusive) to Dungarvan via Cappoquin including a commuter service. In the other direction there are four services to and from Tallow where connections can be made for Fermoy. On Saturdays, a local bus company operate a service to Cork. On Sundays, Bus Éireann route 366 links Lismore to Dungarvan and Waterford. This route only operates on Sundays and comprises a single journey in one direction (no return service on any day of the week).

=== Rail ===
Lismore formerly had a rail station on the now dismantled Waterford to Mallow line and was served by the Cork to Rosslare boat train. The line and station closed in 1967 though the former Lismore railway station building is still extant.

== Gallery ==
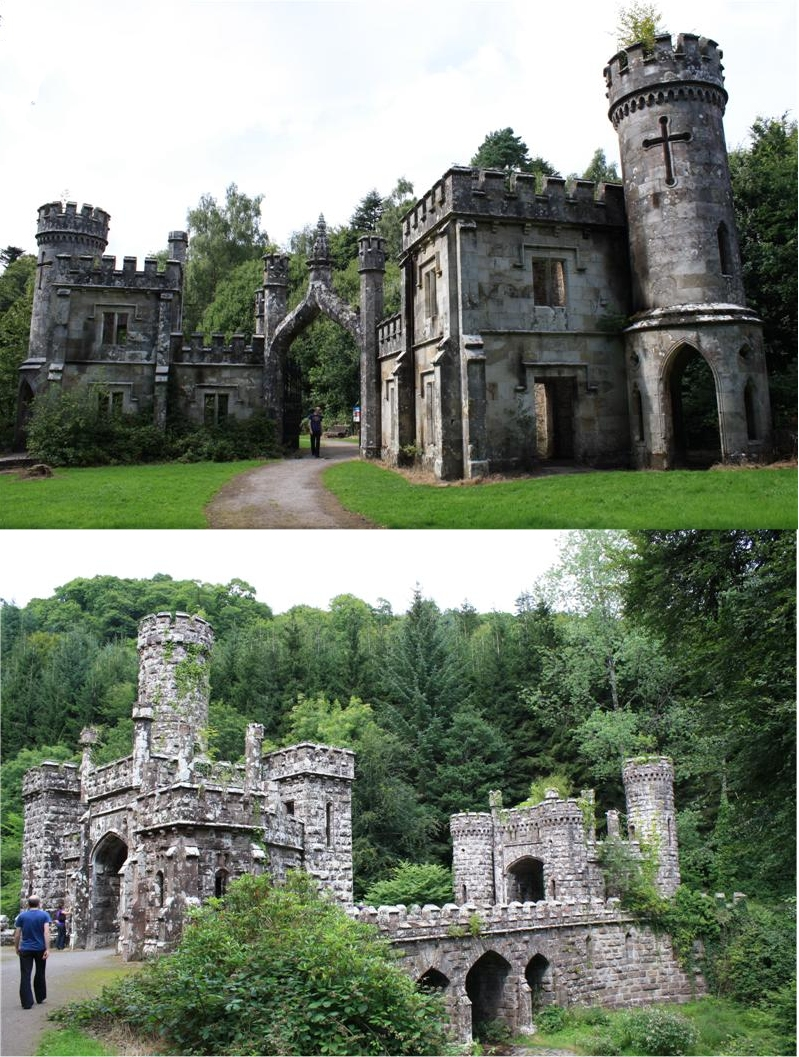
The Ballysaggartmore Towers

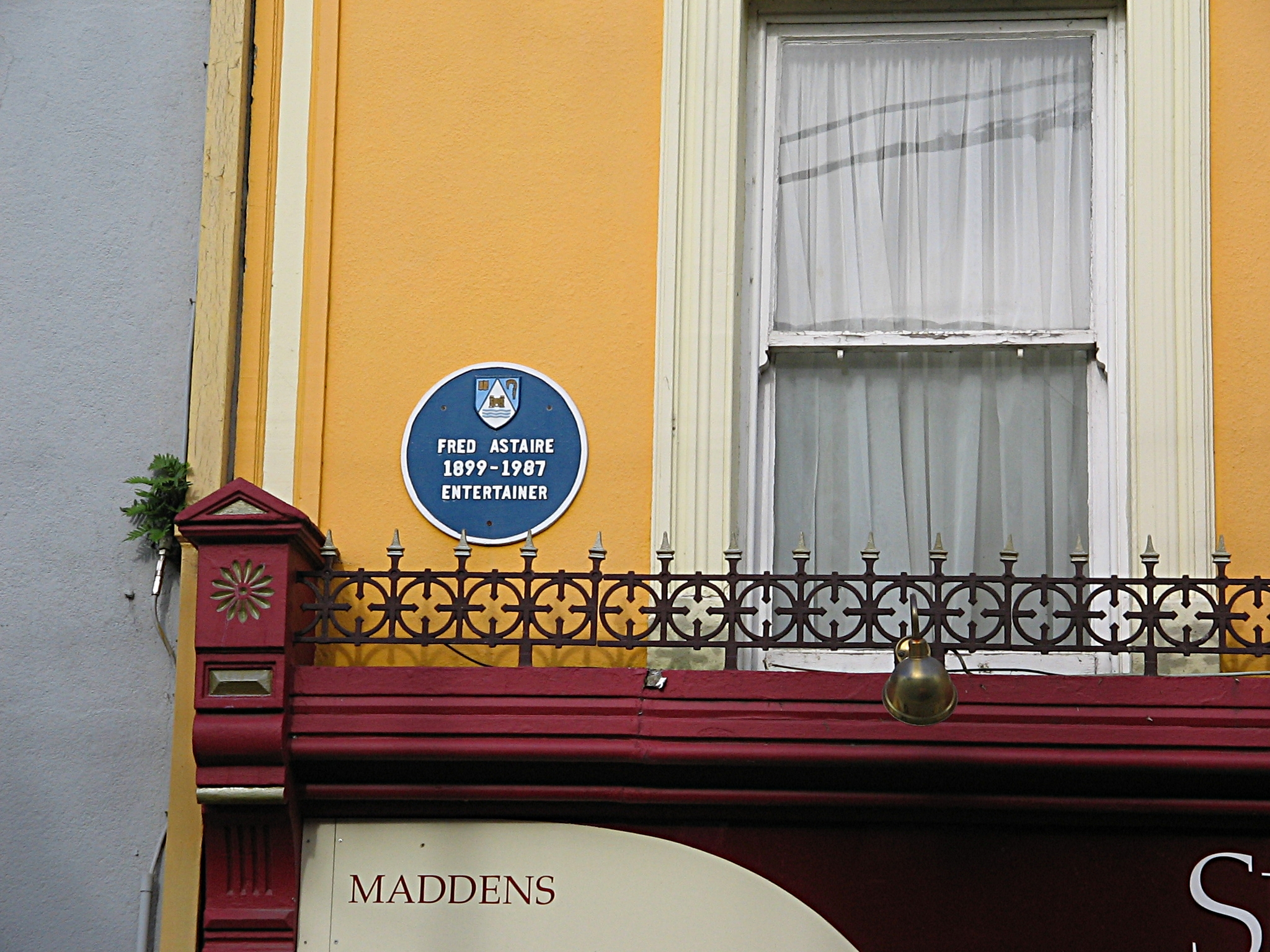
Memorial plaque honouring Fred Astaire on the wall of Madden's Summerhouse Cafe.

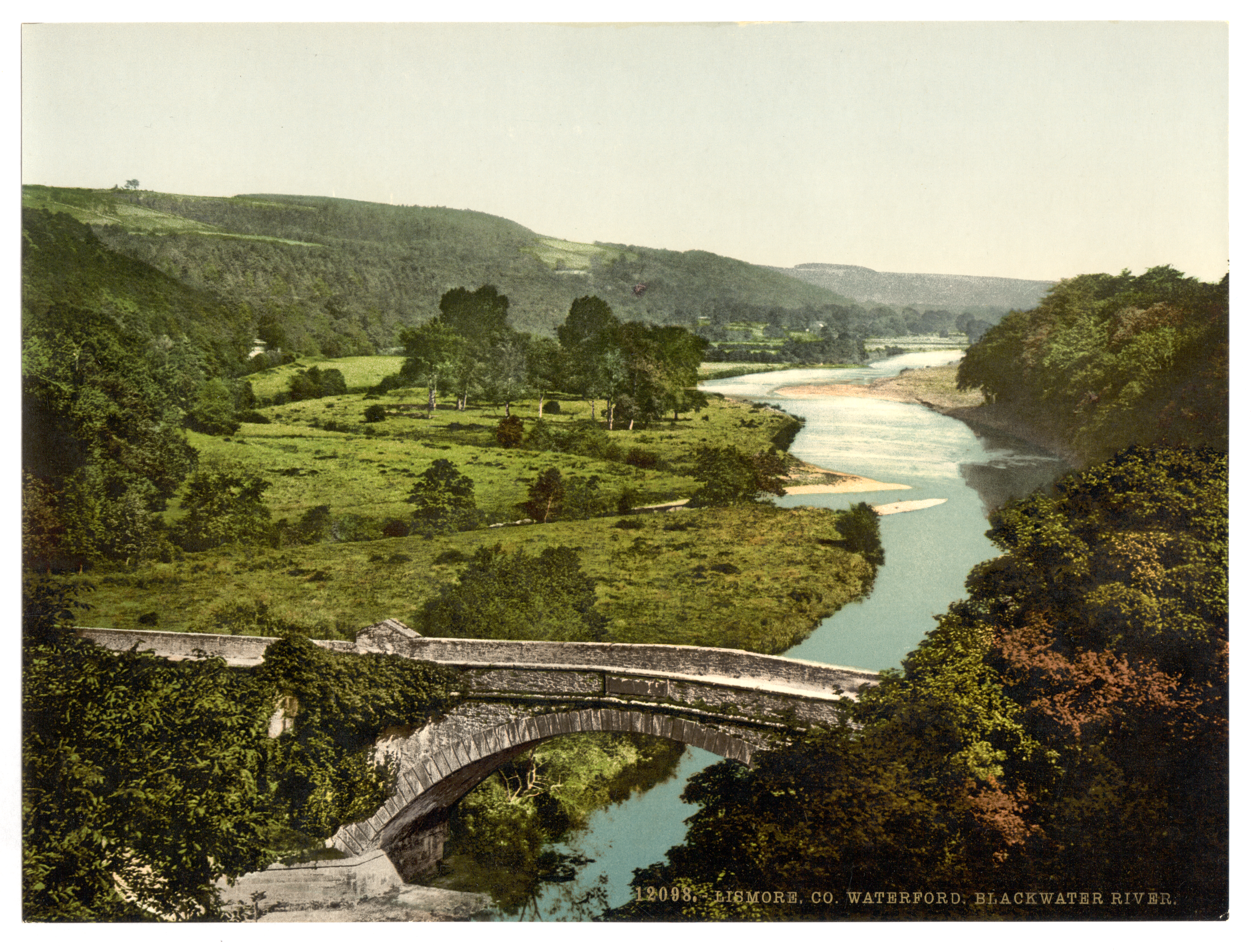
Bridge over the River Blackwater

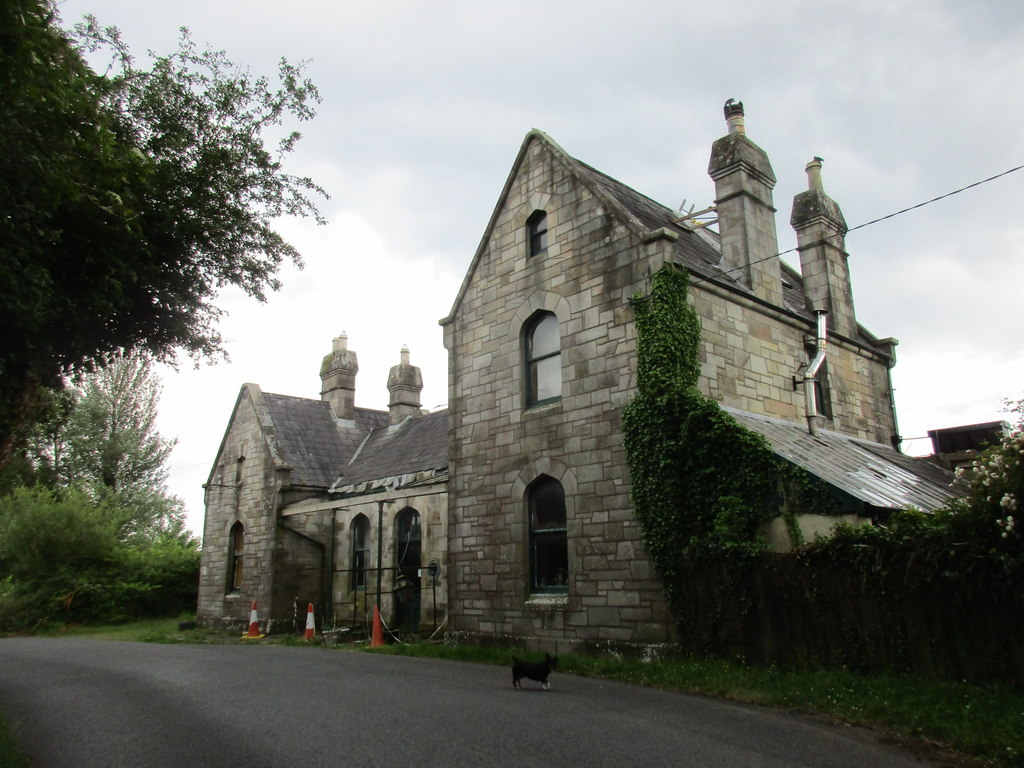
The former Lismore railway station

== Notable people ==
The following people were born in Lismore:

- Robert Boyle (1627–1691), physicist and chemist
- Dervla Murphy (1931–2022), touring cyclist and travel writer
- William Henry Grattan Flood (1859–1928), author, composer, musicologist and historian
- Edmund Duggan (1862–1938), playwright and actor
- Dan Shanahan (born 1977), Waterford hurler
- Maurice Shanahan (born 1990), Waterford hurler
- John Ormonde (1905–1981), Fianna Fáil politician
- Henry Gervais (1712–1790), priest
- Patrick Campbell-Lyons (born 1943), musician

Other notable residents:

- Adele Astaire (1896–1981), lived nearby and was frequently visited by her brother Fred Astaire
- George O'Brien (born 1945), writer
- William Makepeace Thackeray (1811–1863), stayed at the Lismore House Hotel for a period in the mid-19th century

== International relations ==
=== Twin towns — Sister cities ===
Lismore is twinned with

- Lismore, New South Wales, Australia.

== Annalistic references ==
See Annals of Inisfallen.

- AI701.1 Kl. Repose of Cúánna of Les Mór.
- AI707.1 Kl. Conodur of Les Mór rested.
- AI730.1 Kl. Repose of Colmán grandson of Lítán, abbot of Les Mór.
- AI752.3 Repose of Mac Uige, abbot of Les Mór.
- AI760.1 Kl. Tríchmech, abbot of Les Mór, rested, and Abnér, abbot of Imlech Ibuir.
- AI763.1 Kl. Repose of Rónán, bishop of Les Mór.
- AI768.1 Kl. Aedan, abbot of Les Mór, rested.
- AI774.2 Suairlech, abbot of Les Mór, [rested].
- AI778.2 Repose of Airdmesach of Les Mór.
- AI783.3 Repose of Suairlech Ua Tipraiti in Les Mór.
- AI794.4 Violation(?) of the Rule of Les Mór in the reign of Aedán Derg.
- AI814.1 Kl. Repose of Aedán moccu Raichlich, abbot of Les Mór.
- AI814.2 The abbacy of Les Mór to Flann, son of Fairchellach.
- AI818.2 The shrine of Mochta of Lugmad in flight before Aed, son of Niall, and it came to Les Mór.
- AI825.1 Kl. Repose of Flann son of Fairchellach, abbot of Les Mór, Imlech Ibuir, and Corcach.
- AI833.1 Kl. Les Mór Mo-Chutu and Cell Mo-Laise plundered by the heathens.
- AI867.1 Kl. Amlaíb committed treachery against Les Mór, and Martan was liberated from him.
- AI883.1 Kl. The burning of Les Mór by the son of lmar.
- AI912.1 Kl. Repose of Mael Brigte son of Mael Domnaig, abbot of Les Mór.
- AI920.1 Kl. The martyrdom of Cormac son of Cuilennán, bishop and vice-abbot of Les Mór, abbot of Cell Mo-Laise, king of the Déisi, and chief counsellor of Mumu, at the hands of the Uí Fhothaid Aiched.
- AI938.1 Kl. Repose of Ciarán son of Ciarmacán, abbot of Les Mór Mo-Chutu.
- AI947.1 Kl. A leaf [descended] from heaven upon the altar of Imlech Ibuir, and a bird spoke to the people; and many other marvels this year; and Blácair, king of the foreigners, was killed.
- AI953.2 Repose of Diarmait, abbot of Les Mór.
- AI954.3 Diarmait son of Torpaid, abbot of Les Mór, [rested].
- AI958.3 Repose of Cinaed Ua Con Minn, bishop of Les Mór and Inis Cathaig.
- AI959.2 Repose of Maenach son of Cormac, abbot of Les Mór.
- AI983.3 Repose of Cormac son of Mael Ciarain, abbot of Les Mór.
- AI1024.3 Repose of Ua Maíl Shluaig, coarb of Mo-Chutu.

== See also ==
- Blackwater Valley Opera Festival
- List of towns and villages in Ireland
