= Lismore railway station (Ireland) =

Former railway station in Lismore, Co. Waterford, Ireland

Lismore
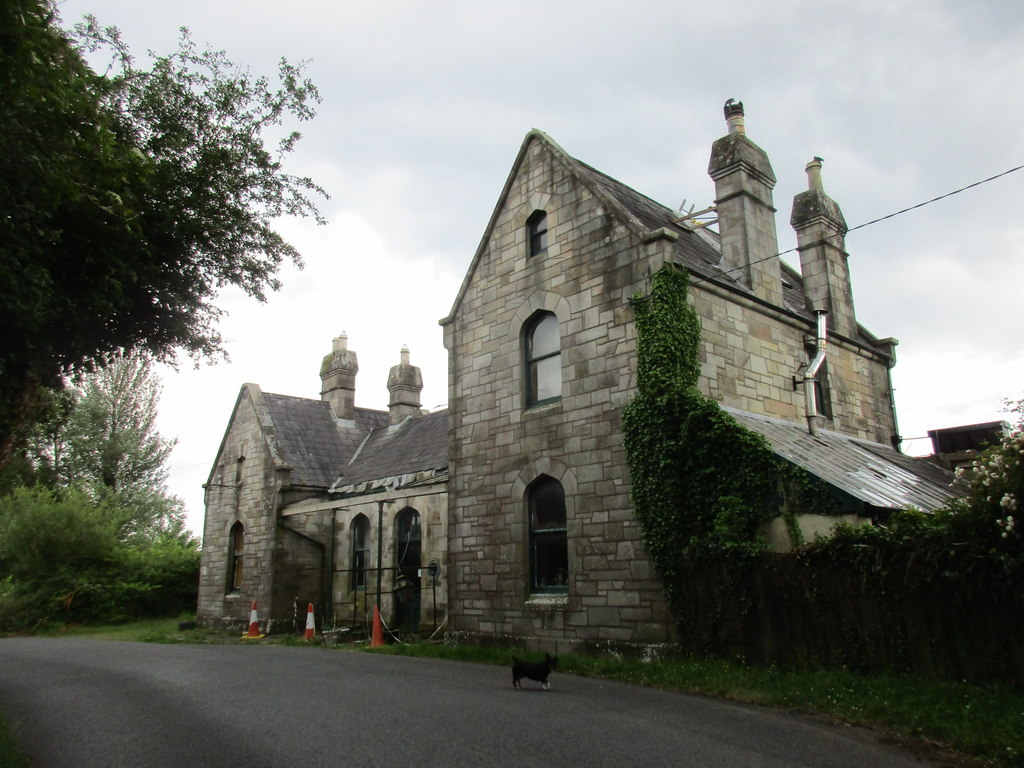
- The former Lismore railway station, photographed in 2017

General information
- Location: Lismore, County Waterford; Ireland
- Coordinates: 52.1328°N 7.9339°W

History
- Opened: 1872
- Closed: 1967
- Original company: Fermoy and Lismore Railway
- Post-grouping: Great Southern Railways

Services
Preceding station	Disused railways	Following station
Tallow Road	Great Southern Railways	Cappoguinn
Location

Lismore railway station, County Waterford is a former train station which served the town of Lismore in County Waterford, Ireland.

== History ==
Prior to the construction of the rail line to Lismore, the freight needs of the area were served by sea-going schooners which sailed the Blackwater river to Cappoquin, and were then connected to Lismore by a canal. Since the newly constructed railway to Fermoy had proved a success, William Cavendish, The 6th Duke of Devonshire (1808-1891) and landlord of Lismore, approached its builder, the Great Southern and Western Railway to extend the line to Lismore but got no positive reception, so decided to build his own line, becoming the biggest shareholder of the newly established Fermoy and Lismore Railway, the line then being informally known as the "Duke's Line". The Duke made the first private railway journey on the line to Lismore on 26 July 1872 and the line officially opened on 1 October 1872.

Lismore station was constructed as the last stop on the Fermoy and Lismore Railway, connecting the town of Lismore to the existing Great Southern and Western Line between Mallow and Fermoy, the latter both in County Cork. The design was influenced by the tastes of the 6th Duke of Devonshire who resided at nearby Lismore Castle and had in effect commissioned the line. Later (in the 1880s) the Fermoy and Lismore Railway became absorbed into the Great Southern and Western Line and eventually, part of the Great Southern Railways. As part of its operation for the Fermoy and Lismore Railway, the complex also included a goods shed, signal cabin, engine shed and turntable.

Lismore was also the terminus of the separate Waterford, Dungarvan & Lismore Railway, who had their own single platform station east of the larger F&LR one, though it was in use for only 10 years from approximately 1878–1888. No trace of this separate building now survives. In 1893, the Waterford, Dungarvan & Lismore Railway took over the operation of the Fermoy and Lismore Railway and apparently connected the two previously separate lines, such that Lismore became a through station on the Waterford–Mallow railway line lying between Tallow Road, the previous penultimate stop, and Cappoguinn.

== Description ==
According to the Irish National Inventory of Architectural Heritage, the building of the station was sponsored by the Duke of Devonshire and constructed of Derbyshire grit stone imported from the Duke's English property at Chatsworth, in a "picturesque Tudor-style"; a 1997 article in the Irish Times describes it as a "a superb example of Victorian Gothic architecture". The Irish National Inventory of Architectural Heritage goes on to commend the "high quality local stone masonry" and states that "the railway station contributes significantly to the quality of the townscape". The "eiretrains" site includes photographs of various fine architectural details, and states that "The station at Lismore is probably one of the most architecturally ornate [small stations] to have been built in Ireland".

According to the "eiretrains" site and its associated extensive photographic documentation, the station had a single platform, although the 1997 Irish Times article states that there were two platforms designated for separating passengers and goods/livestock; as its "second platform", possibly that article is referring to a loading bay or similar that functioned as a point for offloading goods to the substantial stone-built goods shed with an ornate cast iron roof, which was also part of the station complex and was located on the opposite side of the track to the passenger station building.

== Closure and subsequent usage ==
The station was closed to traffic when the line closed in March 1967. In 1995, the station building, which had become derelict since its 1967 closure, was purchased for re-use by a couple who first restored the station-master's house for their own occupation, then converted the extensive stone goods shed, which had been used in the intervening years to house a sausage factory, to form workshops for the operation of traditional craft skills including a working forge, workshops for woodturning, country carpentry, cooopering, toolmaking and tinsmithing.
