= Lismore Courthouse =

Municipal building in Lismore, County Waterford, Ireland

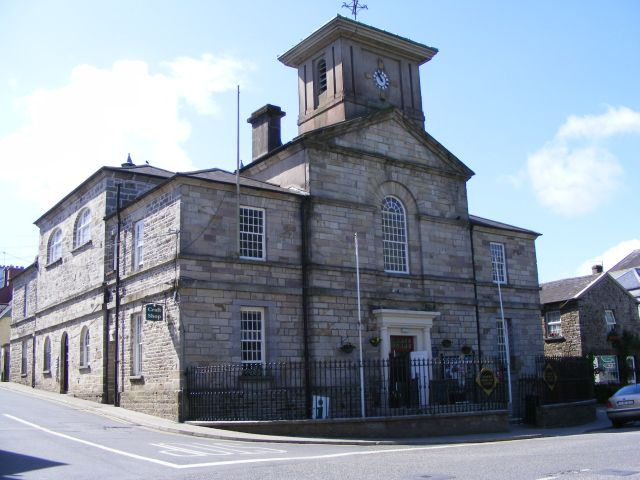
- Lismore Courthouse

- Location within Ireland

General information
- Architectural style: Neoclassical style
- Location: Main Street, Lismore, Ireland
- Coordinates: 52.1370°N 7.9325°W
- Completed: 1815

Design and construction
- Architect: John Carr

Lismore Courthouse, also referred to as Lismore Town Hall, is a former judicial and municipal building in Main Street in Lismore, County Waterford, Ireland. It is currently used as a heritage centre and tourist information centre.

== History ==
The building was commissioned by the local landowner, William Cavendish, 6th Duke of Devonshire, whose seat was at Lismore Castle. It was designed by John Carr in the neoclassical style, built in ashlar stone and was completed in around 1815.

The design involved a symmetrical main frontage of three bays facing onto Main Street. The central bay, which was slightly projected forward, featured a porch formed by Doric order columns supporting an entablature and cornice on the ground floor, and a tall round headed window on the first floor, all surmounted by a pediment. The outer bays were fenestrated by sash windows on both floors. There was originally a central cupola behind the pediment. Internally, the principal rooms were a market hall on the ground floor and a courtroom on the first floor.

Following the adoption of the Towns Improvement (Ireland) Act 1854 in 1855, the newly appointed town commissioners and magistrates used the courtroom for their board meetings and petty sessions respectively on alternating Saturdays. It thereby started to serve as the local town hall as well as the courthouse. The building was refurbished in 1890, when the cupola was replaced by a square clock tower with wide eaves and a shallow pyramid-shaped roof. By the early 20th century, it was covered in neatly-clipped ivy.

The building was badly burned in rioting on 8 June 1920 during the Irish War of Independence, but was fully restored in 1924. The courtroom on the first floor was subsequently used as a community events venue hosting dances and other functions. The Courts Service ceased using the building as a courthouse in 1985.

Following completion of an extensive programme of refurbishment works, the building was re-opened by the chairman of Bord Fáilte, Martin Dully, as the Lismore Heritage Centre in May 1992. The courtroom was refurbished to a design by Shaffey Architects and brought back into use as a district court in 2006, but the Courts Service announced in February 2022 that, after hearings had been relocated to Dungarvan, the courtroom would close again for judicial use.
