= St Carthage's Church, Lismore =

St. Carthage Church, Lismore
- St Carthage’s Roman Catholic Parish Church, Lismore
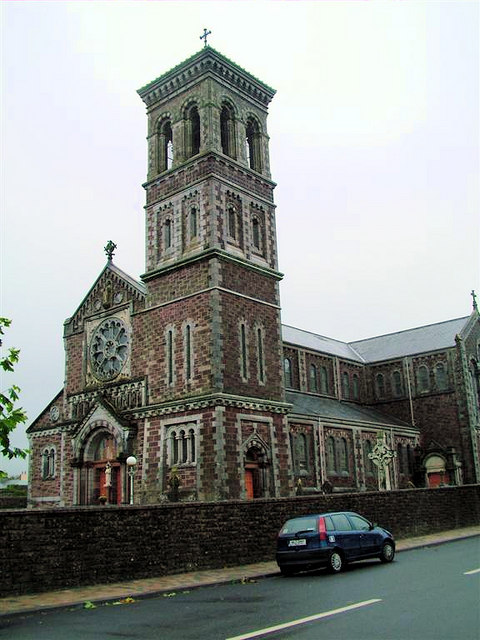
- St. Carthage Church, Lismore
- 52°08′09″N 007°55′50″W
- Country: Ireland
- Denomination: Catholic Church

History
- Dedication: St. Carthage

Architecture
- Architect: W.G Doolin
- Completed: 1884

Administration
- Diocese: Roman Catholic Diocese of Waterford and Lismore

Clergy
- Bishop: Alphonsus Cullinan
- Priest: Michael Cullinan

St Carthage's Church is a Roman Catholic church in Lismore, County Waterford. It is included in the Record of Protected Structures maintained by Waterford City and County Council.

== History ==
St Carthage's Parish Church, built on the site of an earlier church, was constructed between 1881 and 1884. It was designed by architect Walter Glynn Doolin, and is an example of a Lombardo-Romanesque style church. The Church has held Catholic ceremonies since its opening. The current bishop is Alphonsus Cullinan and its current priest is Michael Cullinan.

== Construction ==
The church was built using red sandstone and white limestone. Its bell tower is 37 metres tall.

Above the main entrance doorway is a mosaic of Jesus Christ. A rose window surrounded by the symbols of the apostles can be seen above the mosaic. In front of this window stands a statue of St. Carthage.
