= Lismore Crozier =

Irish insular crozier dated to between 1100 and 1113 AD

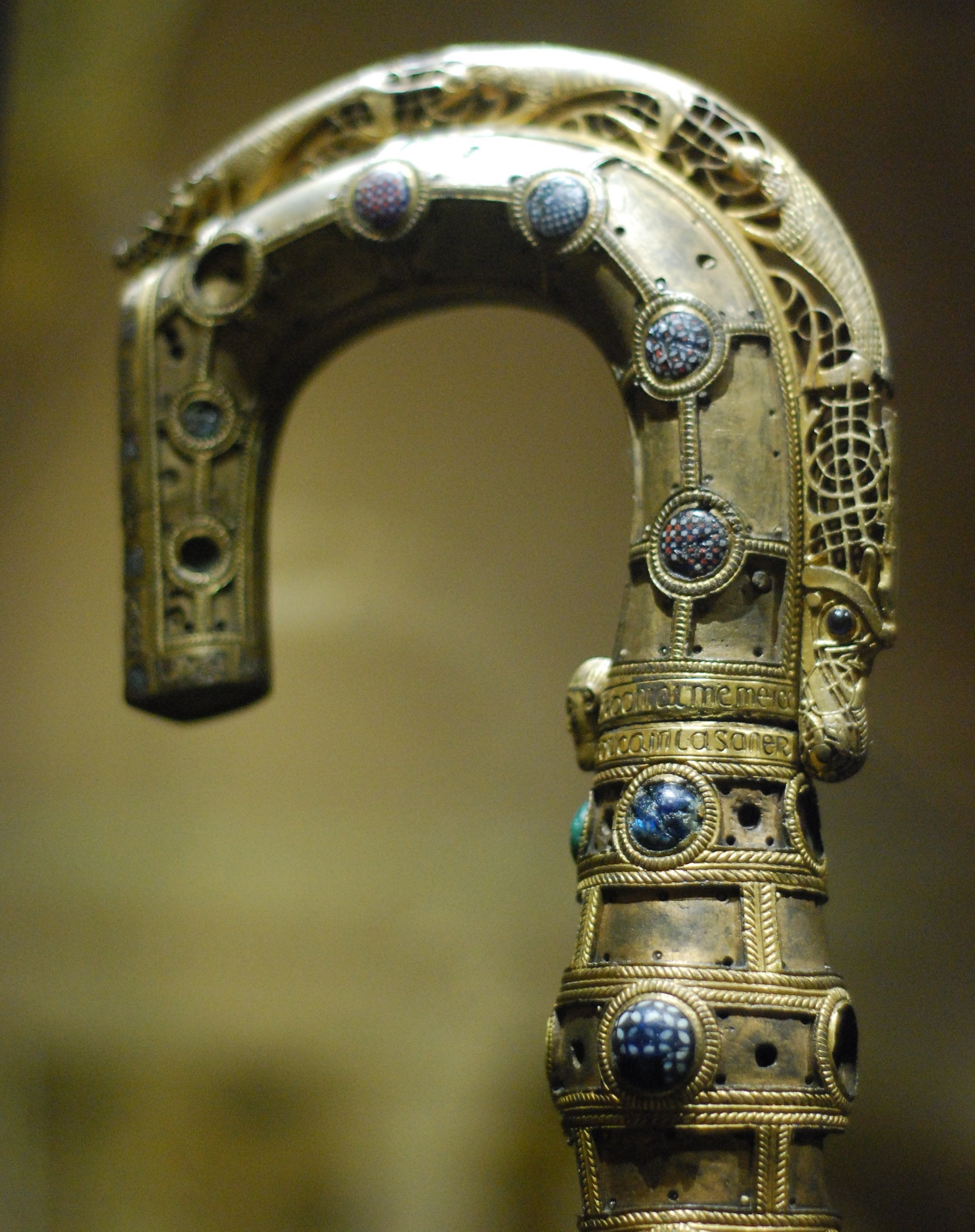
- View of crozier’s drop, crook and upper knopes
- Material: wood, silver, gold, niello, glass
- Size: height: 116 cm (46 in)
- Created: early 12th century, probably c. 1100
- Discovered: Lismore Castle, County Waterford, Ireland
- Present location: National Museum of Ireland, Kildare Street, Dublin

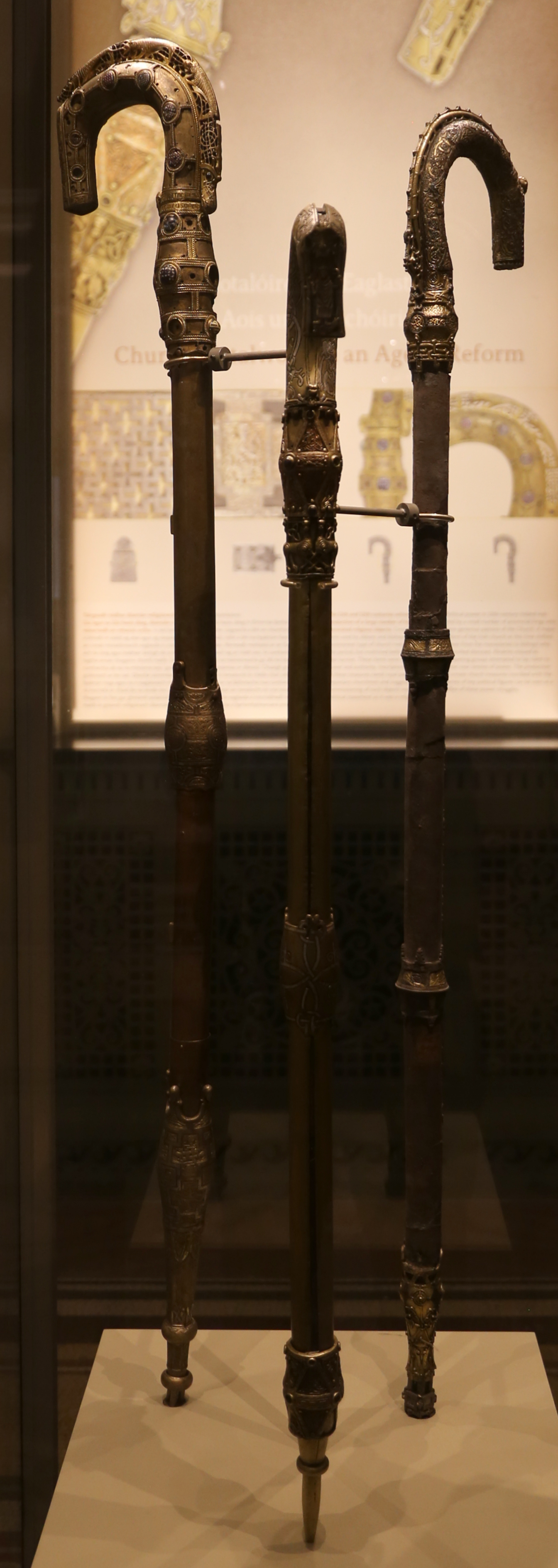
The Lismore, Clonmacnoise and River Laune croziers on display.

The Lismore Crozier is an Irish Insular-type crozier dated to between 1100 and 1113 AD. It consists of a wooden tubular staff lined with copper-alloy plates; embellished with silver, gold, niello and glass; and capped by a crook with a decorative openwork crest. The inscriptions on the upper knope record that it was built by "Nechtain the craftsman" and commissioned by Niall mac Meic Aeducain, bishop of Lismore (d. 1113). This makes it the only extant insular crozier to be inscribed, and the only one whose date of origin can be closely approximated. It was rediscovered in 1814 —along with the 15th-century Book of Lismore— in a walled-up doorway in Lismore Castle, County Waterford, where it was probably hidden in the late Middle Ages during a period of either religious persecution or raids.

The crozier is held in the National Museum of Ireland (NMI) on Kildare Street, Dublin. During a 1966 refurbishment, two small relics and a linen cloth were found inside the crook (the curved top-piece). An early 20th-century copy is in the collection of the Metropolitan Museum of Art, New York.

== Description ==
The crozier is 115 cm high and built from a wooden core, with added copper-alloy plates containing silver, gold, niello and glass. It is almost fully intact and in relatively good condition with little modern reworking. Losses include gold foil panels decorated with interlace filigree patterns from the sides of the crook and upper knops (the rounded metal projections on the staff); the gold was presumably stripped for sale sometime in the late medieval or early modern periods.

The decoration and patterns across the object are influenced by Viking art, particularly the contemporary Urnes style, which is characterised by slim and stylised animals interwoven with tight patterns. The art historian Máire de Paor described it as showing, like the Crozier of Dysert O'Dea, the "Irish-Urnes in its full development".

=== Shaft, knops and ferrule ===
Its shaft is made from oak wood and contains three knops, the lower of which is cast into the ferrule (foot or base). This area is decorated with cast panels with zoomorphic figures, as well the heads and full figures of humans, the latter of which have been compared in style to the 7th- and 11th-century Bearnan Chulain shrine. The upper knope contains holdings for insert panels, which are lost.

Unusually for medieval croziers, the ferrule is fully intact and in place: the Dunloe and Clonmacnoise croziers are the only other surviving examples that have retained this element. The Lisomore ferrule contains openwork patterns terminating with three legs. It has a loose bronze ring around it, which rattles when the crozier is moved. According to art historian Griffin Murray, "there seems to be no other explanation for the presence of these rings except to produce this noise, which may point to the importance of sound in the use of crosiers in Christian rituals in early medieval Ireland".

=== Crook and drop ===
The crook was cast as a single piece on a mostly hollow wooden core. The crook is decorated on both sides with blue glass studs placed within gold collars that hold white, blue and red millefiori glass insets. The missing panels probably contained gold filigree, while the drop once held semi-precious stones fixed within gold collars. The crest contains a procession of three open-jawed animals terminating in another animal head with blue eyes. The front of the drop contains zoomorphic interlace panels, but is missing its original gold-foil border.

During refurbishment at the NMI in 1966, two small relics were found in the interior of the drop and crest's base, although they are probably secondary (i.e. added later). The reliquary inside the crest consists of a piece of wood, measuring 31mm in length, 16mm in width and is 6mm deep. The reliquary within the drop is slightly larger (width: 22mm, length: 18mm, depth: 15mm) and comprises a single sheet of copper-alloy folded into a box containing "tiny slivers of wood". It is thin enough that it would have been slid in as an insert into the drop's side. A piece of woven linen cloth measuring 40mm x 23mm was also found during the opening of the crook, and may have been a brandeum, i.e. placed to represent the Holy shroud.

== Inscriptions and dating ==
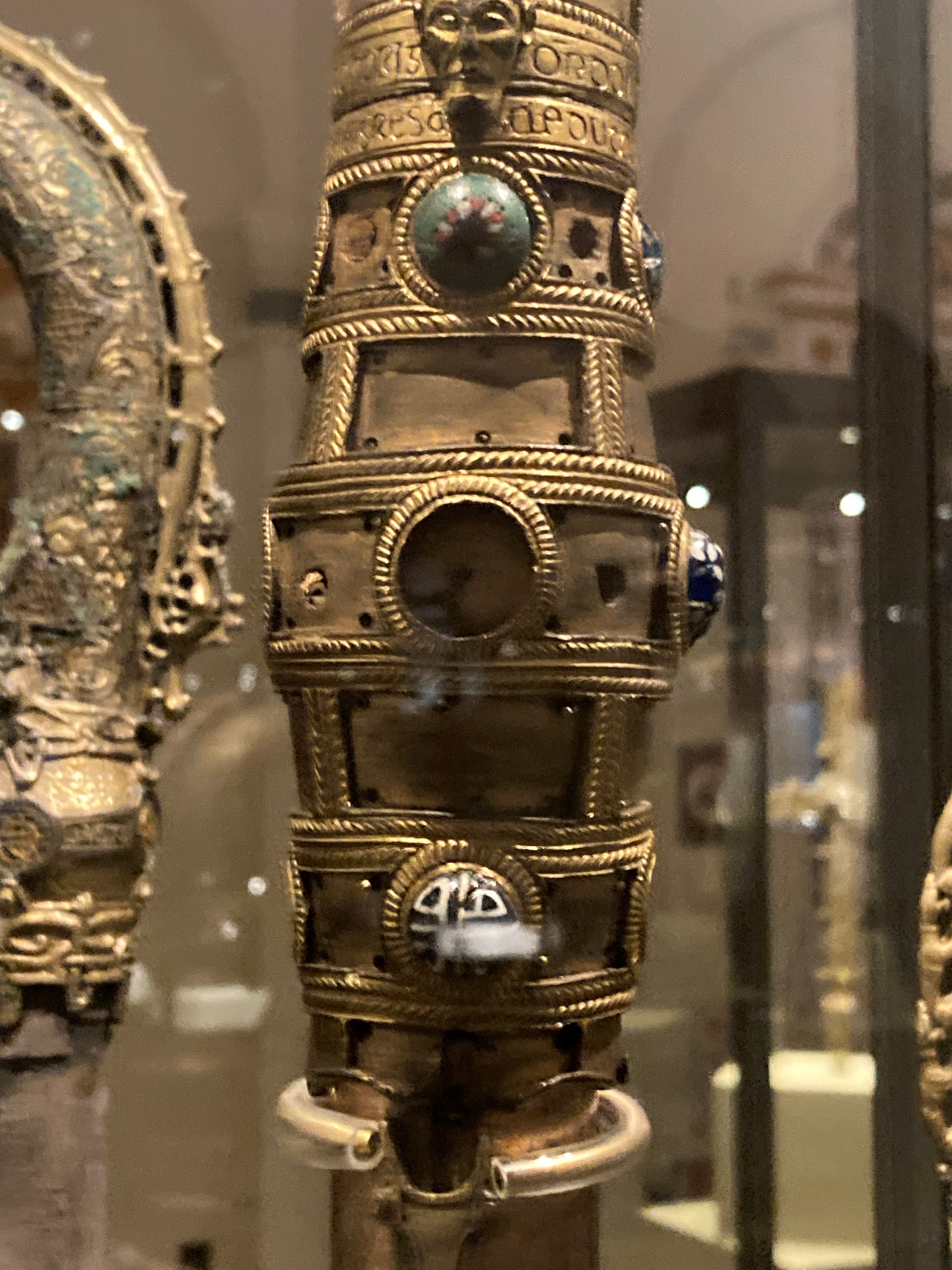
Upper knop, with inscriptions. The Inisfallen Crozier is to the left

The crozier's two inscriptions are located on the crook and read "OR DON IAL MC MEICC AEDUCAIN LASAN[D]ERNAD I GRESA" ("Pray for Nial Mc Meicc Aeducain for whom this work was made"), and OR DO NECTAICERD DO RIGNE I GRESA" ("Pray for Nechtain, craftsman, who made this object"). recording the names of "Nechtain the craftsman" and the crozier's commissioner, Niall mac Meic Aeducain, a bishop of Lismore. From this, art historians believed it was produced for the 1111 Synod of Ráth Breasail in County Tipperary, which confirmed Lismore as a diocese. Art historians believe the crozier was constructed to enhance Lismore's chances of promotion. Mac Meic Aeducain is known to have died in 1113, making this the latest possible date for the crozier's completion.

Nechtain placed the inscriptions in a very narrow space and so had to use abbreviations, and in some instances omitted letters (for example "Niall" is spelled with only one "l", and "Lasandernad" is missing the central "d"). Based on style and technique, Nechtain is further associated with the early 12th-century Small's Reef sword guard, now in the National Museum of Wales; the Cross of Cloyne, now at the NMI; and a drinking-horn terminal, now in County Carlow.

== Provenance ==
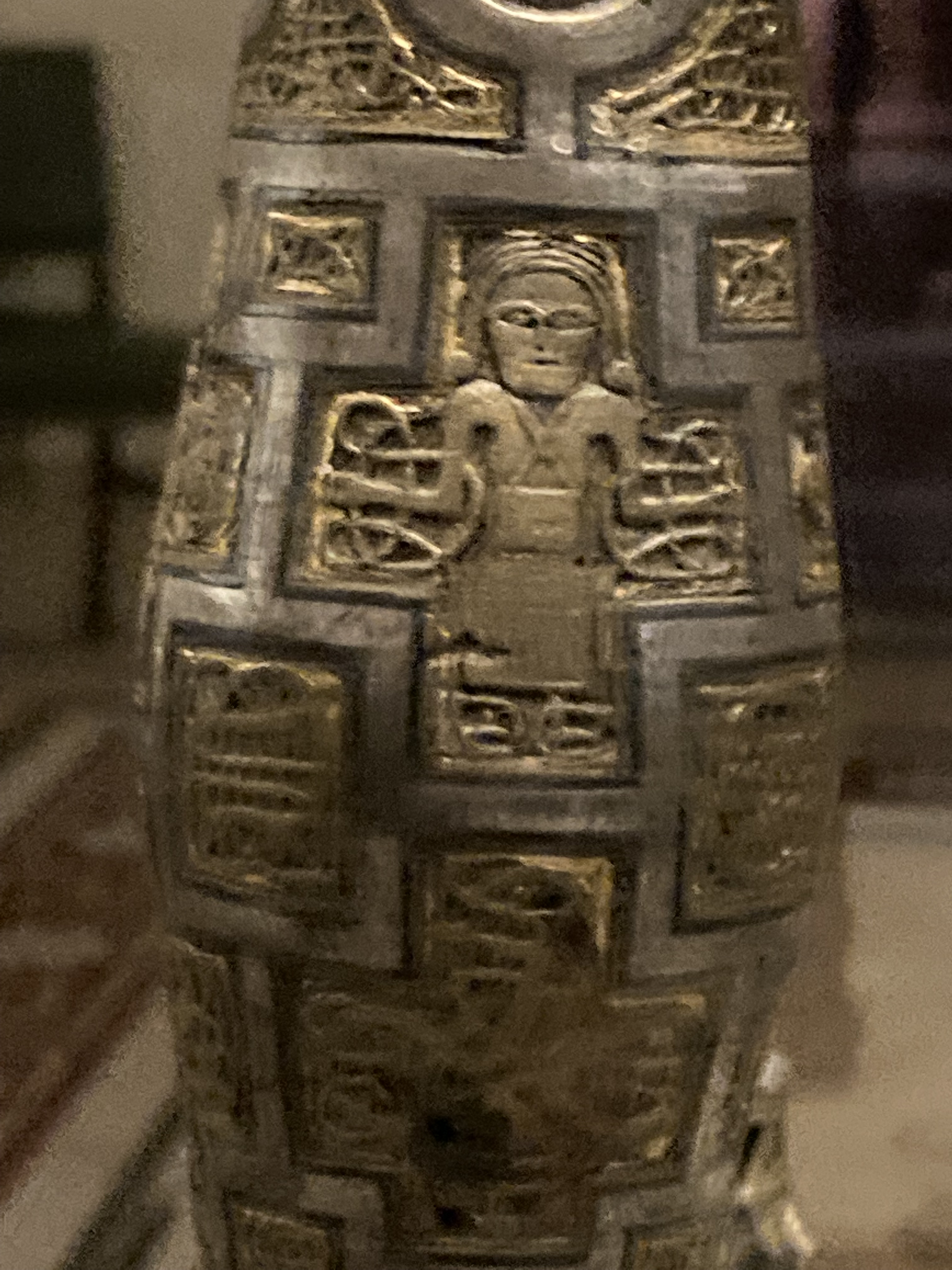
Detail of one of the knopes

The Lismore Crozier, packed in a wooden box, was rediscovered in 1814 by workmen reconstructing Lismore Castle. It was found in a concealed doorway, alongside the 15th-century Book of Lismore. The castle was built by King John of England in 1185 on the site of the former Lismore Abbey where the Bishops of Lismore resided; the crozier would have been produced in the abbey's scriptorium.

It is believed that the crozier was hidden during the late medieval period, likely during a period of religious persecution, and forgotten about during a transfer of ownership of the castle. A number of other significant Irish insular period objects were found in this way: the Stowe Missal (Tipperary) was also found in a walled-up door, an early medieval altar plate was discovered in a gable at the nunnery of St. Catherine d'Conyl in County Limerick, while the Sheephouse hoard had been hidden in a quarry near Mellifont Abbey, County Louth.

The crozier is now in the collection of the National Museum of Ireland in Dublin. The Book of Lismore was kept at Chatsworth House, near Chesterfield, Derbyshire, in England, by the Duke of Devonshire, who owns Lismore Castle. It was donated In 2020 to University College Cork by the Chatsworth Settlement Trust.

== Sources ==
- Johnson, Ruth. "Irish Crucifixion Plaques: Viking Age or Romanesque?". Journal of the Royal Society of Antiquaries of Ireland, volume 128, 1998. JSTOR 25549845
- Moss, Rachel. Medieval c. 400—c. 1600: Art and Architecture of Ireland. New Haven, CT: Yale University Press, 2014. ISBN 978-0-3001-7919-4
- Ó Floinn, Raghnal; Wallace, Patrick (eds), Treasures of the National Museum of Ireland: Irish Antiquities. Dublin: National Museum of Ireland, 2002. ISBN 978-0-7171-2829-7
- Ó Floinn, Raghnal. "The Clonmacnoise crozier". In: Ryan, Michael (ed.), Treasures of Ireland: Irish art 3000 B.C. – 1500 A.D., 165–6. Dublin: Royal Irish Academy, 1983. ISBN 978-0-9017-1447-3
- de Paor, Máire. "The Viking Impact". In: Treasures of early Irish art, 1500 B.C. to 1500 A.D: From the collections of the National Museum of Ireland, Royal Irish Academy, Trinity College Dublin Archived 6 June 2021 at the Wayback Machine. NY: Metropolitan Museum of Art, 1977. ISBN 978-0-8709-9164-6
- De Paor, Máire (published as Máire MacDermott). "The Crosiers of St. Dympna and St. Mel and Tenth-Century Irish Metal-Work". Proceedings of the Royal Irish Academy: Archaeology, Culture, History, Literature, volume 58, 1956. JSTOR 25505072
- Mitchell, Perette. "The Inscriptions on Pre-Norman Irish Reliquaries". Proceedings of the Royal Irish Academy: Archaeology, Culture, History, Literature, volume 96C, no. 1, 1996. JSTOR 25516156
- Murray, Griffin. "The history and provenance of two early medieval crosiers ascribed to Clonmacnoise Archived 18 August 2021 at the Wayback Machine". Dublin: Proceedings of the Royal Irish Academy: Archaeology, Culture, History, Literature, 2021
- Murray, Griffin. "The Makers of Church Metalwork in Early Medieval Ireland: Their Identity and Status Archived 11 September 2021 at the Wayback Machine". Proceedings of the Sixth International Insular Art Conference, 2013
- Murray, Griffin. "Insular-type crosiers: their construction and characteristics". Making and Meaning in Insular Art: Proceedings of the Fifth International Conference on Insular Art, 2007
- Murray, Griffin. "The ‘hidden power’ of the Irish crosier". Archaeology Ireland, volume 17, issue 4, 2004
- O'Neill, Timothy. The Irish Hand: Scribes and Their Manuscripts From the Earliest Times. Cork: Cork University Press, 2014. ISBN 978-1-7820-5092-6
- Stokes, Margaret. Early Christian Art in Ireland, Part 1. London: Chapman and Hall, 1887
