= Ballysaggartmore Towers =

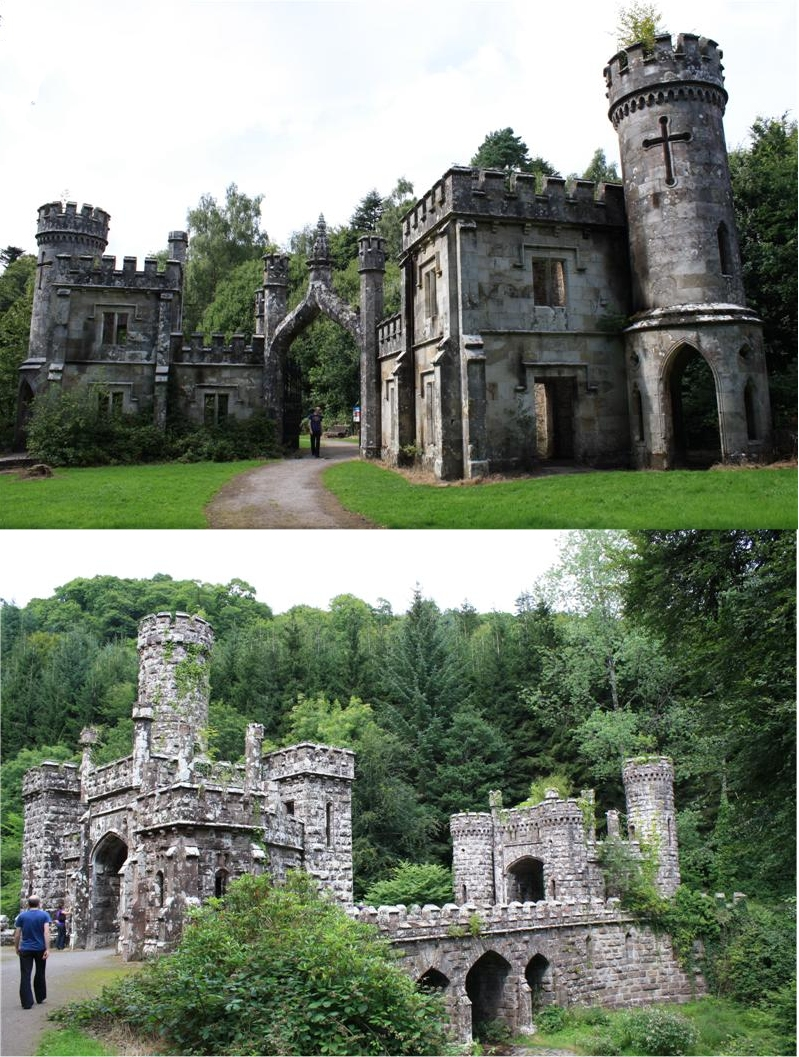
- Top: Main entrance gate and attached flanking gate lodges. Bottom: Road bridge (crossing a ravine) with attached lodges.

- Location within Ireland
- 52°08′52″N 07°57′32″W
- Location: Ballysaggartmore, Lismore, County Waterford

History
- Built: 19th century
- Built for: Arthur Keily-Ussher

Site notes
- Architect: John Smyth
- Architectural style: Gothic

Ballysaggartmore Towers (Irish: Baile na sagart mór) are two ornate entrance lodges (one also acts as a bridge) that are situated on the former Ballysaggartmore Demesne approx 2.5 kilometres from the town of Lismore in County Waterford, Ireland. The structures are considered architectural "follies".

== Origins ==
They were constructed for an Anglo Irish Landlord, Arthur Keily-Ussher no later than 1834. He held an estate of approximately 8000 acres, the majority of which was rented to tenant farmers but he retained approximately 1000 acres as a personal demesne. The lodges were constructed on the main avenue leading to the family's residence; Ballysaggartmore House. The house itself was large but of a very plain design, which was in obvious contrast to the lodges. An account from 1834 indicates that a main house predated the lodges. This account also reports that they were built from designs by the head gardener, John Smyth, and that the main entrance gates were forged locally for the sum of about £150.

== Folklore and folly ==
Local lore suggests that the grand entrance lodges were built as a prelude to an extravagant mansion that Keily-Ussher intended to build but never did as he ultimately ran out of funds for their construction, and that his building pursuits were spurred on by his jealous wife who was envious of her sister in-law who lived at the stately Strancally Castle. However no contemporary account exists from the period.

== Legacy ==
Controversy surrounds Arthur Keily-Ussher. He has been accused of being a harsh landlord and evicting tenants who were unable to pay their rents during the Great Famine (1845-1849) and an attempt was made on his life during the period.

== Post Keily-Ussher ==
Keily-Ussher died c.1862 and the estate was sold by a liquidator. The house, gardens and some of the lands were purchased by the Woodroofe family and these were later owned by a family named Anson. The house was destroyed by arson attack during the Civil War period and the ruined stone fabric was removed in the mid 20th century. One of the lodges was still in use as a private residence in the 1970s.

== Modern era ==
The lodges are un-roofed but extant and are surrounded by forested land. A walking trail encompassing them has been developed, and there is a picnic and parking area nearby. As of May 2026 the towers remain intact and popular for walkers.
