= George O'Brien (writer) =

Irish writer

- Born: 14 February 1945 (age 81); Enniscorthy, County Wexford, Ireland
- Writing career
- Genre: Non-fiction

George O'Brien (born 14 February 1945 in Enniscorthy, County Wexford) is an Irish memoirist, writer, and academic.

== Life ==
O'Brien was raised by his paternal grandmother in Lismore, County Waterford after his mother died. He was educated at St. Augustine College, in Dungarvan. In 1962, he moved to Dublin to live with his father and stepmother. He graduated as an electronic engineer from the College of Technology, Kevin Street, Dublin Institute of Technology and worked as an apprentice photographer. He moved to London where he worked as a barman, clerk and encyclopaedia salesman. He continued his education at Ruskin College, Oxford in 1968, then moved to Warwick University in 1970 where he graduated with a BA in English and American Literature in 1973, and earned a PhD in 1980.

O'Brien taught at the University of Birmingham (1974) and at Clare College, Cambridge (1975), then lectured at Warwick University (1976–1980). He crossed the Atlantic where he was visiting assistant professor at Vassar College, Poughkeepsie (1980–1984), and then became associate professor, then professor of English at Georgetown University in Washington (1984–present).

== Works ==
His memoirs include The Village of Longing: An Irish Boyhood in the Fifties (1987); Dancehall Days, or Love in Dublin (1988); and Out of Our Minds (1994). He has written studies of Irish playwright Brian Friel, co-edited The Ireland Anthology with Sean Dunne, and received the Irish Book Awards silver medal, and the John Eddeyrn Hughes Prize for The Village of Longing. O'Brien has also written occasional literary journalism for the Irish Times.

== Resources ==
- O'Brien's biography at Irish Writers Online
- Out of Our Minds, book review
- Professor George O'Brien; listing at Georgetown University
