= Waterford–Mallow railway line =

Closed railway line in Ireland

Waterford–Mallow

Technical
- Track gauge: 1,600 mm (5 ft 3 in) Irish gauge

The Waterford–Mallow railway line ran from Waterford to Mallow and allowed for trains to run directly from Waterford to Cork City.

== History ==
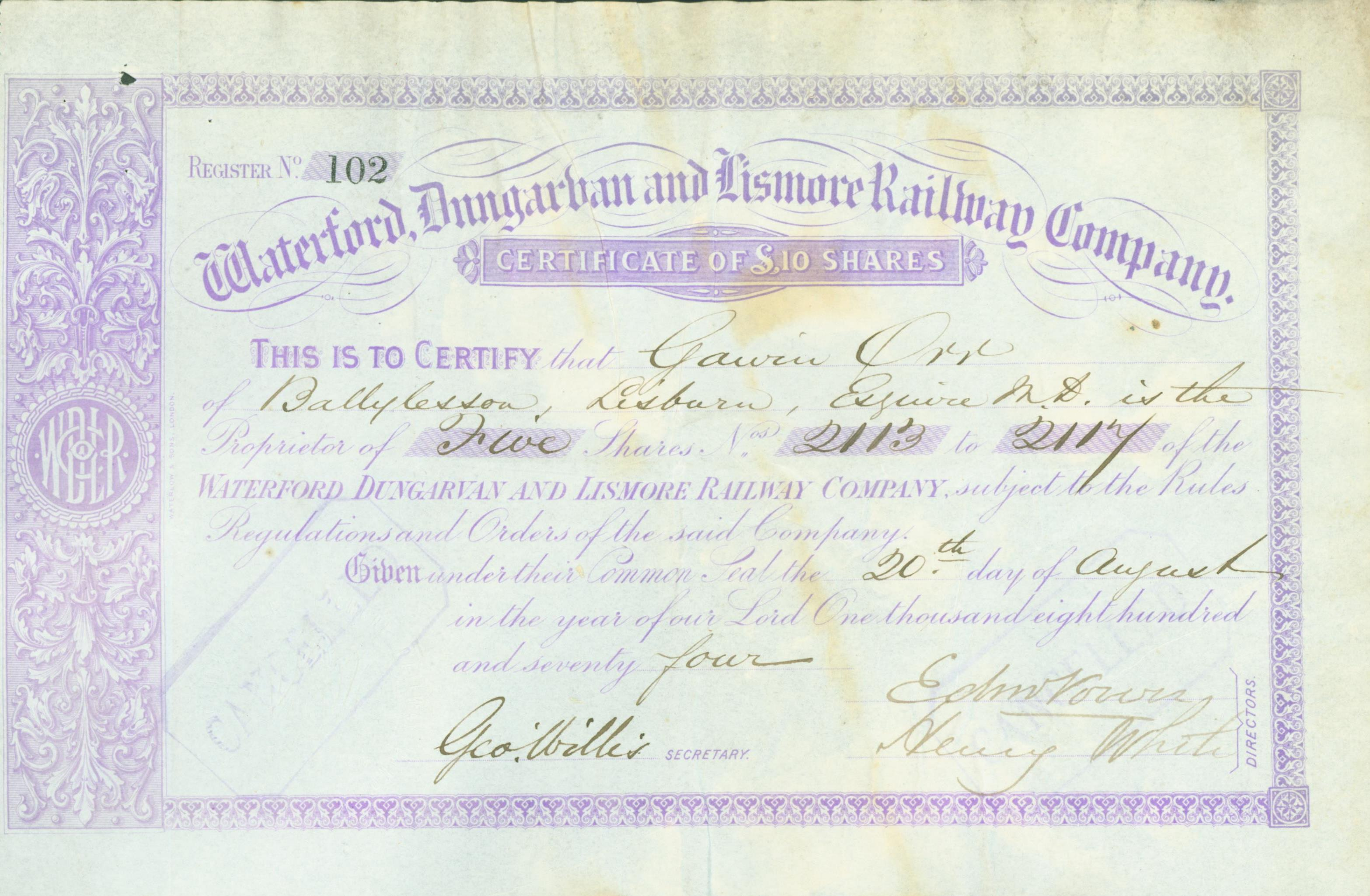
Share of the Waterford, Dungarvan and Lismore Railway Company, issued 20 August 1874

The line was opened in stages by various companies and was completely opened on 12 August 1878.

On 17 May 1860 the Great Southern and Western Railway (GS&WR) opened a 16 3/4 miles (27.0 km) branch from Mallow (on its Dublin to Cork main line) to Fermoy. An extension from Fermoy to Lismore was approved to be constructed by the Fermoy and Lismore Railway in 1869 and following opening on 1 October 1872 was operated by the GS&WR.

Waterford, Dungarvan, and Lismore Railway Act 1872
- Act of Parliament
- Parliament of the United Kingdom
- Long title: An Act to authorise the construction of a Railway from Waterford to Dungarvan and Lismore, in the county of Waterford, to be called "The Waterford, Dungarvan, and Lismore Railway;" and for other purposes.
- Citation: 35 & 36 Vict. c. cvi

Dates
- Royal assent: 18 July 1872

Waterford, Dungarvan, and Lismore Railway Act 1873
- Act of Parliament
- Parliament of the United Kingdom
- Long title: An Act to amend "The Waterford, Dungarvan, and Lismore Railway Act, 1872," and to enable the Waterford Dungarvan and Lismore Railway Company to make deviations from their authorised Railway, and to abandon a portion of the authorised Railway; to extend the time for the execution of works; to afford facilities to the Company for raising the funds necessary to execute their Undertaking; and for other purposes.
- Citation: 36 & 37 Vict. c. cxxxii

Dates
- Royal assent: 7 July 1873

Text of statute as originally enacted

Waterford, Dungarvan, and Lismore Railway (Extension) Act 1878
- Act of Parliament
- Parliament of the United Kingdom
- Long title: An Act to authorise the Waterford, Dungarvan, and Lismore Railway Company to extend their railway from their present terminus at Waterford into the city of Waterford; and for other purposes.
- Citation: 41 & 42 Vict. c. ccvi

Dates
- Royal assent: 22 July 1878

Text of statute as originally enacted

The Waterford, Dungarvan and Lismore Railway (WD&LR) was incorporated by the Waterford, Dungarvan, and Lismore Railway Act 1872 (35 & 36 Vict. c. cvi) and fully opened its 43 miles (69 km) section on 12 August 1878; thus completing the continuous connection from Cork via Mallow to Waterford. The WD&LR operated its own trains and was to take over operation of the Fermoy to Lismore section from the GS&WR on 1 March 1893.

The route was completely taken over by the GS&WR in 1898.

The line closed in March 1967 for economic reasons. As most patronage was for Cork on the boat train it was possible to re-route between Waterford and Mallow via Limerick Junction, a route that was of greater mileage but which only resulted in a maximum 10 minute increase in journey time.

== Route ==
From Waterford to Dungarvan has some significant 1 in 66 inclines to two summits. In 2022 a Greenway was proposed along the old route from Mallow to Dungarvan.

== Services ==
The Fishguard and Rosslare Railways and Harbours Company gained authority to run a boat service from Fishguard, Wales to Rosslare Harbour in 1895. The GS&WR were then able to run a service notably including a twelve-wheeled dining car from Rosslare routing via Waterford and Mallow at considerable convenience for travellers going to Cork City and further south-west.
