= Lismore Abbey =

Lismore Abbey is a former monastery in Lismore, County Waterford, Ireland. Its site is now occupied by Lismore Castle.

== History ==
=== Foundation by Mochuda ===
Lismore Abbey was founded around 632 by Mochuda, in a picturesque site, steeply rising from the southern bank of the River Blackwater. Its founder had spent nearly forty years of his monastic life in the monastery of Rahan on the southern borders of ancient Meath. In 631 Prince Blathmac, son of Aedh Slaine, of the southern Hy Mall, evicted him, and he moved to Ardfinnan and then Lismore, on the edge of what was then called Avonmore, "the great river", a site granted to him by the prince of the Desii of Waterford. Lismore was founded around 632; Mochuda died few years later.

=== Pre-eminent scholars of Lismore ===
Lismore produced another saint and scholar, Cathal (known as Cataldus of Taranto), and it appears he was also born at Rathan. Irish annals tell us nothing of Cathaldus, because he went abroad early in life, but the brothers Morini of his adopted home provide some information. They tell us he was a native of Hibernia - born at Rathan in Momonia - that he studied at Lismore, and became bishop of his native territory of Rathan, but that afterwards, he made his way to Jerusalem, and on his return was, with his companions, wrecked at Taranto in Italy. He is said to have converted many of the inhabitants to Christianity, and became the city's patron saint.

Another scholar of Lismore was Cuanna, most likely the half-brother and successor of the founder. He was born at Kilcoona, or Killcooney, a parish near Headford in Galway which takes its name from him. No doubt he went to Lismore on account of his close connexion with Cataldus, and for the same reason was chosen to succeed him in the school of Lismore. One historian thought that the ancient but now lost "Book of Cuanach", cited in the Annals of Ulster, but not later than A.D. 628, was the work of this Cuanna of Kilcooney and Lismore. It is also said that Aldfrith, King of Northumbria, spent some time at the school of Lismore, for he visited most of the famous schools of Ireland towards the close of the seventh century, and at that time Lismore was one of the most celebrated. It was also a place of pilgrimage, and many Irish princes gave up the sceptre and returned to Lismore to end their lives in prayer and penance. There, too, by his own desire, was interred Celsus of Armagh, who died in Ardpatrick, but directed that he should be buried in Lismore (though no trace of his monument has been found).

=== Artifacts ===
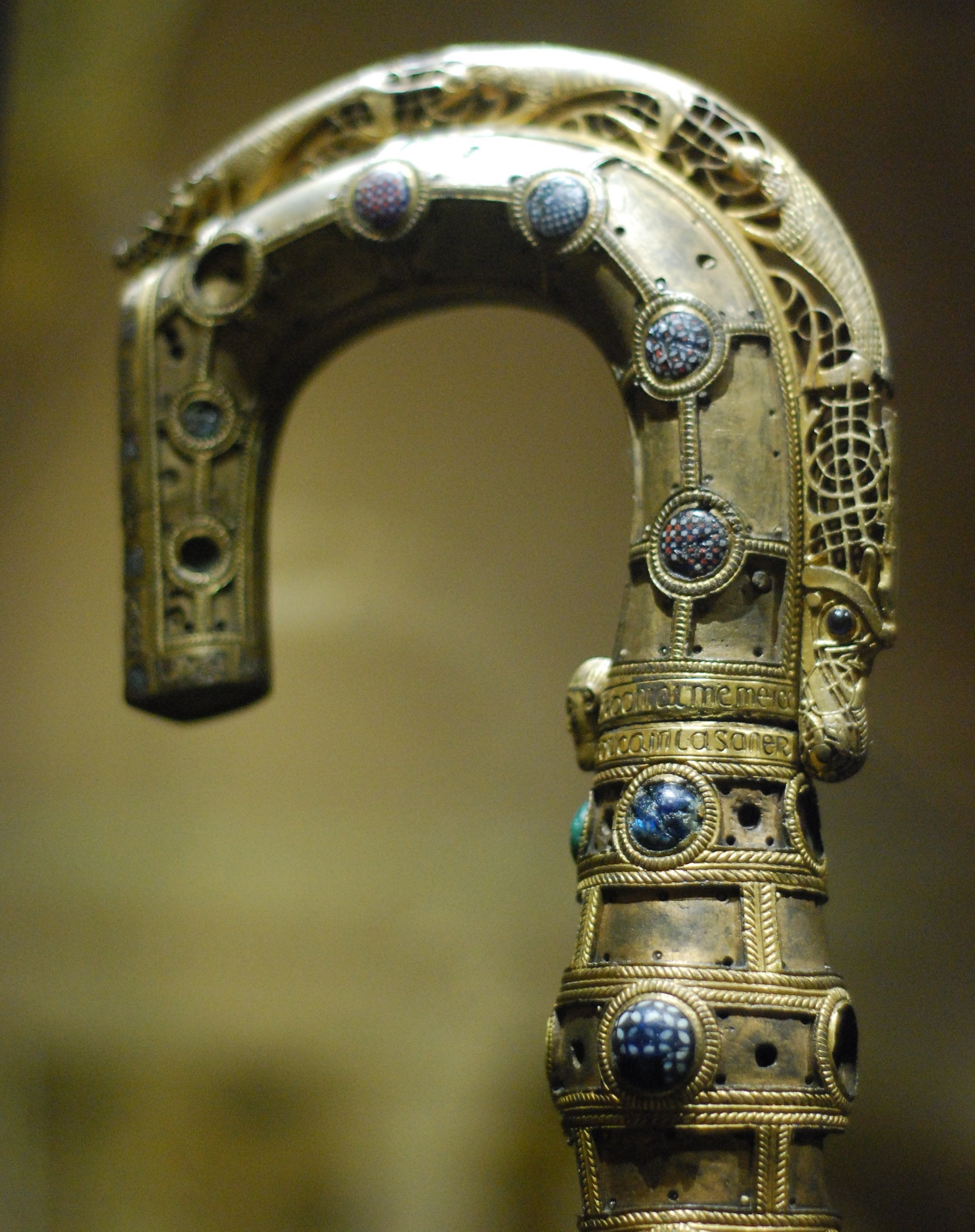
The Lismore Crozier, c. 1100, National Museum of Ireland

Two interesting memorials of Lismore are still preserved. The first is the Lismore Crozier, found accidentally in Lismore Castle in 1814, and now in the National Museum of Ireland. The inscription tells us that it was made for Niall Mac Mic Aeducan, Bishop of Lismore, 1090–1113, by Neclan the artist. This refers to the making of the case or shrine, which enclosed an old oak stick, the original crozier of the founder. Most of the ornaments are richly gilt, interspersed with others of silver and niello, and bosses of coloured enamels.

The second is the Book of Lismore found in the castle at the same time with the crosier, enclosed in a wooden box in a built-up doorway. The castle was built as long ago as 1185 by Prince John. The book contains a series of the lives of Irish saints, written in medieval Irish.

Afterward the bishops of Lismore came to live at the castle, both the crosier and book belonged were hidden for security. They were rediscovered during renovations in 1814.

== Sources ==
- Moss, Rachel. Medieval c. 400—c. 1600: Art and Architecture of Ireland. New Haven, CT: Yale University Press, 2014. ISBN 978-0-3001-7919-4
- O'Neill, Timothy. The Irish Hand: Scribes and Their Manuscripts From the Earliest Times. Cork: Cork University Press, 2014. ISBN 978-1-7820-5092-6
