= Lismore House Hotel =

Hotel in Lismore, County Waterford, Ireland

Coordinates: 52.1375°N 7.9325°W

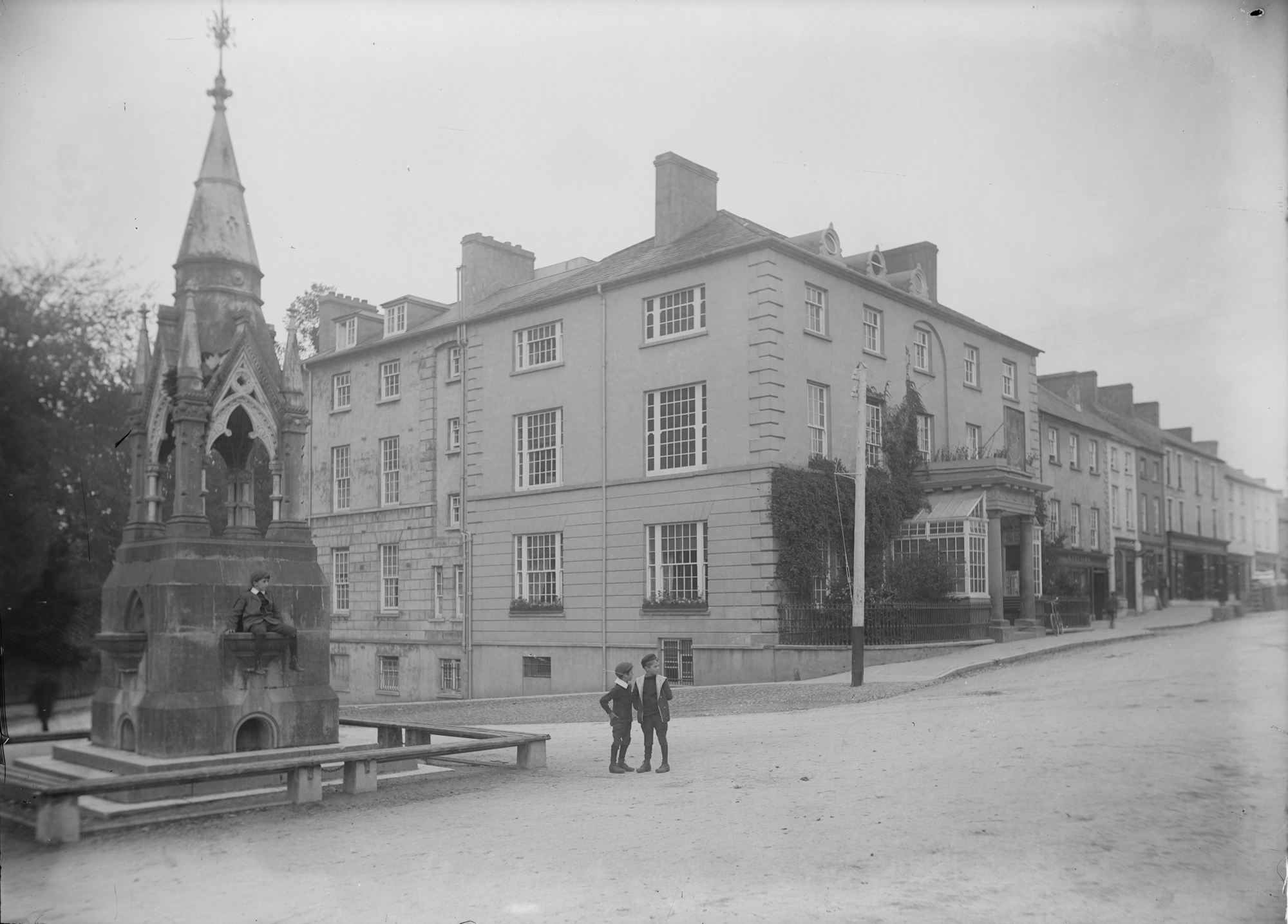
View of the hotel and the ornate fountain (left of the image), between 1900 and 1939

The Lismore House Hotel is a hotel building located in Lismore, County Waterford in Ireland. Formerly known as the Devonshire Arms Hotel, and historically associated with the Duke of Devonshire, it was built in the late 18th century and featured in travel guides since at least the 19th century. It is included on the Record of Protected Structures maintained by Waterford City and County Council. The hotel is in the town centre, overlooking the Ambrose Power Memorial, close to the Lismore Heritage Centre and the entrance to Lismore Millennium Park and castle grounds. Closed in 2016, as of early 2023, the hotel remained closed.

== History ==
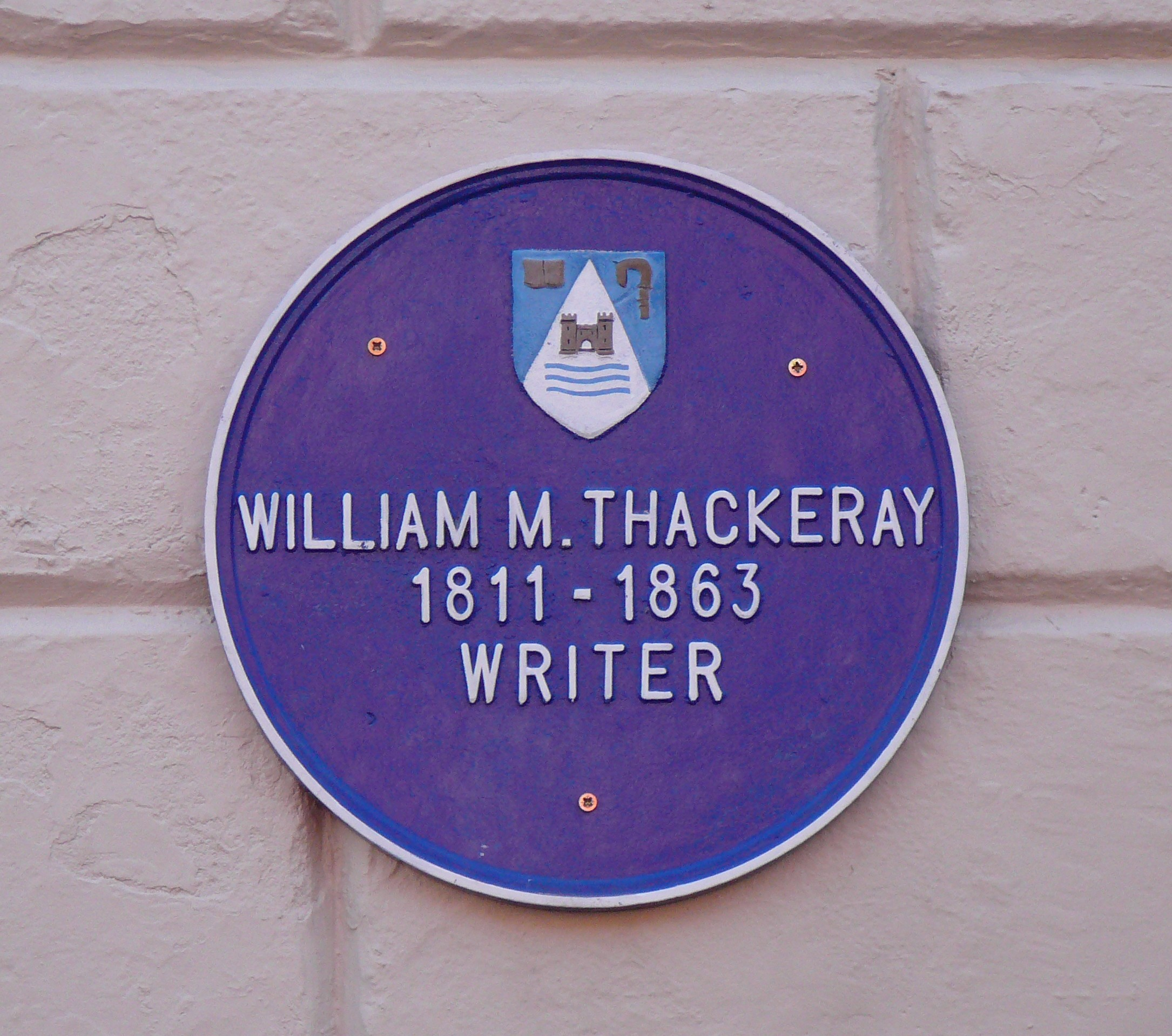
Plaque at the hotel noting connection to William Makepeace Thackeray

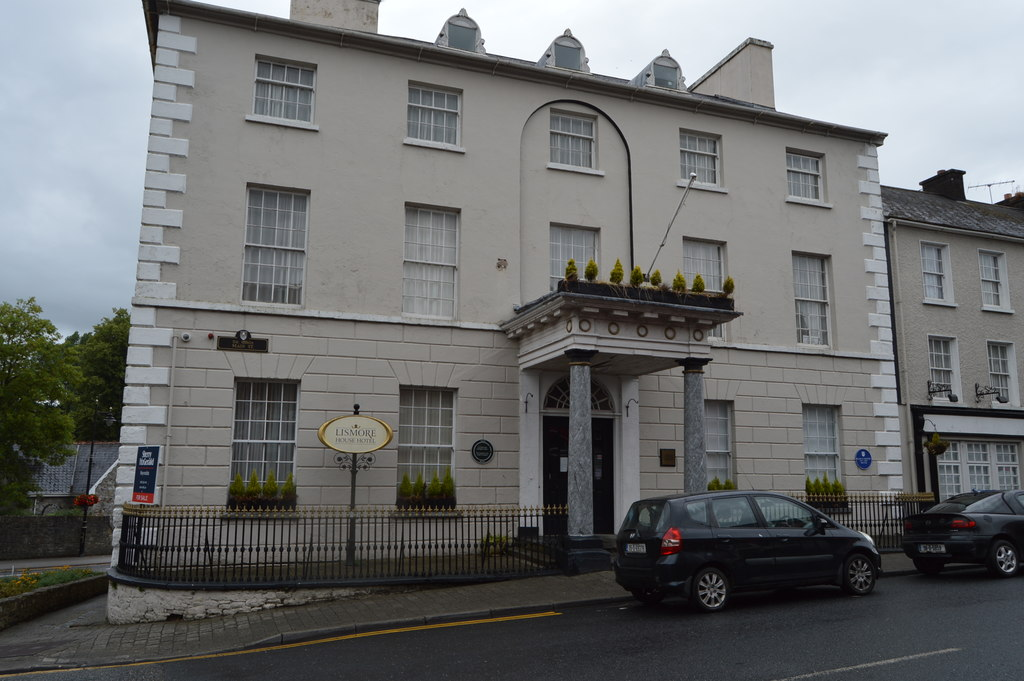
Hotel entrance in July 2018

While several sources date the hotel to 1797, and assert that it is reputed to be Ireland's "first purpose-built hotel", other sources (including the National Inventory of Architectural Heritage) suggest that the hotel was developed in the 1840s on the site ("and possibly incorporating fabric") of a 1770s house.

The hotel has been featured in travel guides since at least the 19th century, and a guide from 1871 advises tourists to dine or lunch at the hotel when travelling on the road from Youghal, allowing three shillings for the purpose. The British writer, William Makepeace Thackeray, stayed at the hotel in the mid-19th century.

The hotel was updated and rebranded in 2006, before becoming the subject of litigation between the then owners and bank lenders. This litigation was resolved in 2016, and the hotel was sold in 2018.

The hotel, which had been closed since 2016, was allocated for use as temporary emergency accommodation for asylum seekers in early 2023. While the proposal was met with some initial opposition due to a perceived "lack of consultation between the government and the community", a number of international protection applicants ("mainly families with 23 children under the age of 17") were placed in the hotel in February 2023.
