= Mo Chutu of Lismore =

7th-century Irish saint and abbot of Rahan

Saint Mo Chutu of Lismore
- Mochutu, Carthach (the Younger), Carthagus, Carthage, Mochuda
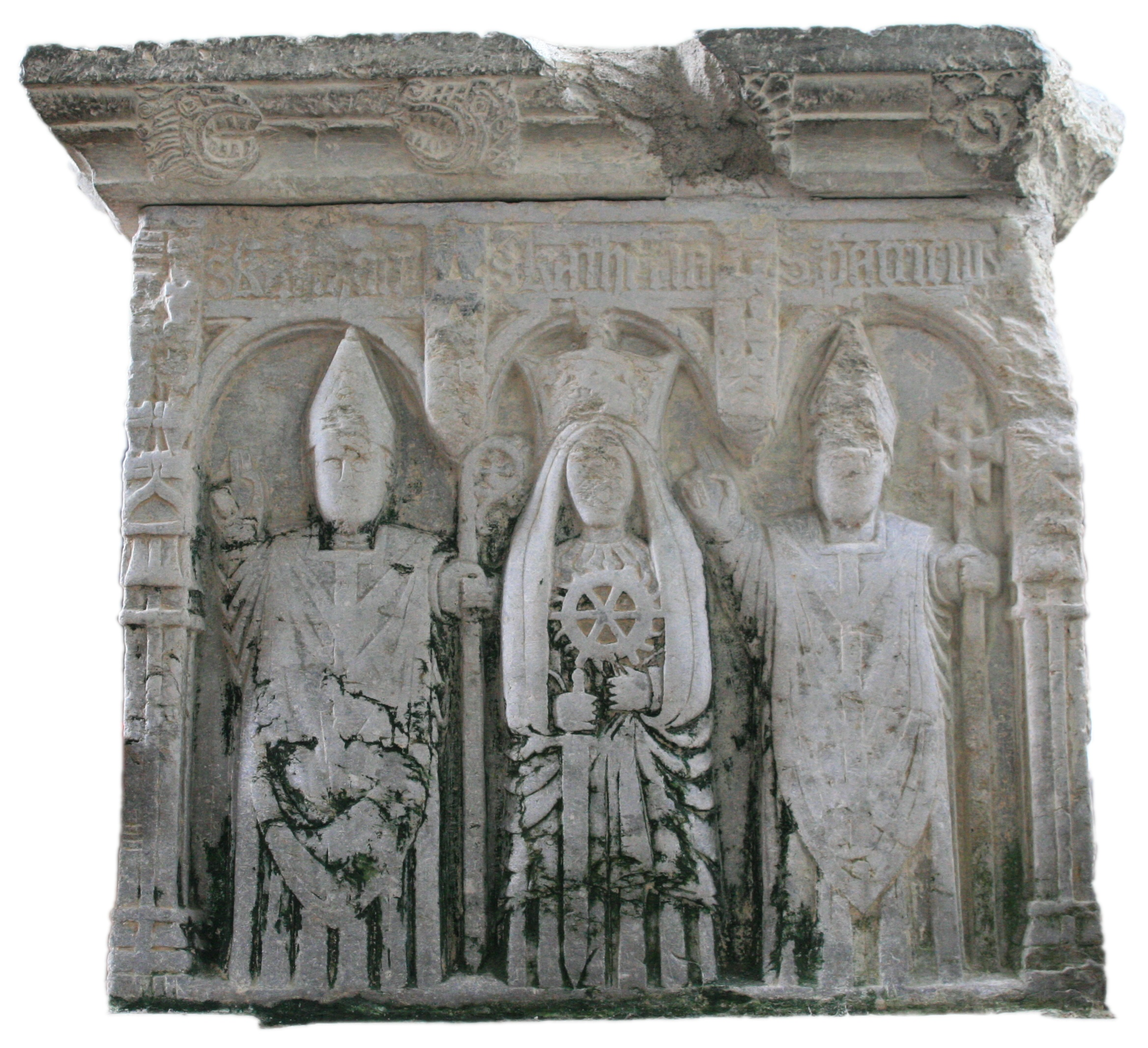
- Mo Chutu along with Catherine and Patrick on an altar tomb of 1543 in St Carthage's cathedral in Lismore

Personal details
- Died: 14 May 637

Sainthood
- Feast day: 14 May
- Venerated in: Catholic Church; Eastern Orthodox Church (as Saint Cyprian)
- Patronage: Lismore, Ireland

Mo Chutu mac Fínaill (died 14 May 637), also known as Mochuda, Carthach or Carthach the Younger (a name Latinized as Carthagus and Anglicized as Carthage /ˈkɑːrθədʒ/), was abbot of Rahan, County Offaly, and subsequently, founder and first abbot of Lismore (Irish: Les Mór Mo Chutu), County Waterford. The saint's Life has come down in several Irish and Latin recensions, which appear to derive from a Latin original written in the 11th or 12th century.

== Life ==
Through his father, Fínall Fíngein, Mo Chutu belonged to the Ciarraige Luachra, while his mother, Finmed, was of the Corco Duibne. Notes added to the Félire Óengusso (the Martyrology of Óengus) claim that his foster father was Carthach mac Fianáin, that is Carthach the Elder, whose period of activity can be assigned to the late 6th century.

Mo Chutu first became abbot of Rahan, a monastery which lay in the territory of the southern Uí Néill. He composed a rule for his monks, an Irish metrical poem of 580 lines, divided into nine separate sections, a notable literary relic of the early Irish Church.

According to the Annals of Ulster, he was expelled from the monastery during the Easter season of 637. The incident has been connected with the Easter controversy, in which Irish churches were involved during the 7th century. Through his training in Munster, Mo Chutu may have been a supporter of the Roman system of calculation, which would have brought him into conflict with adherents of the 'Celtic' reckoning in Leinster.

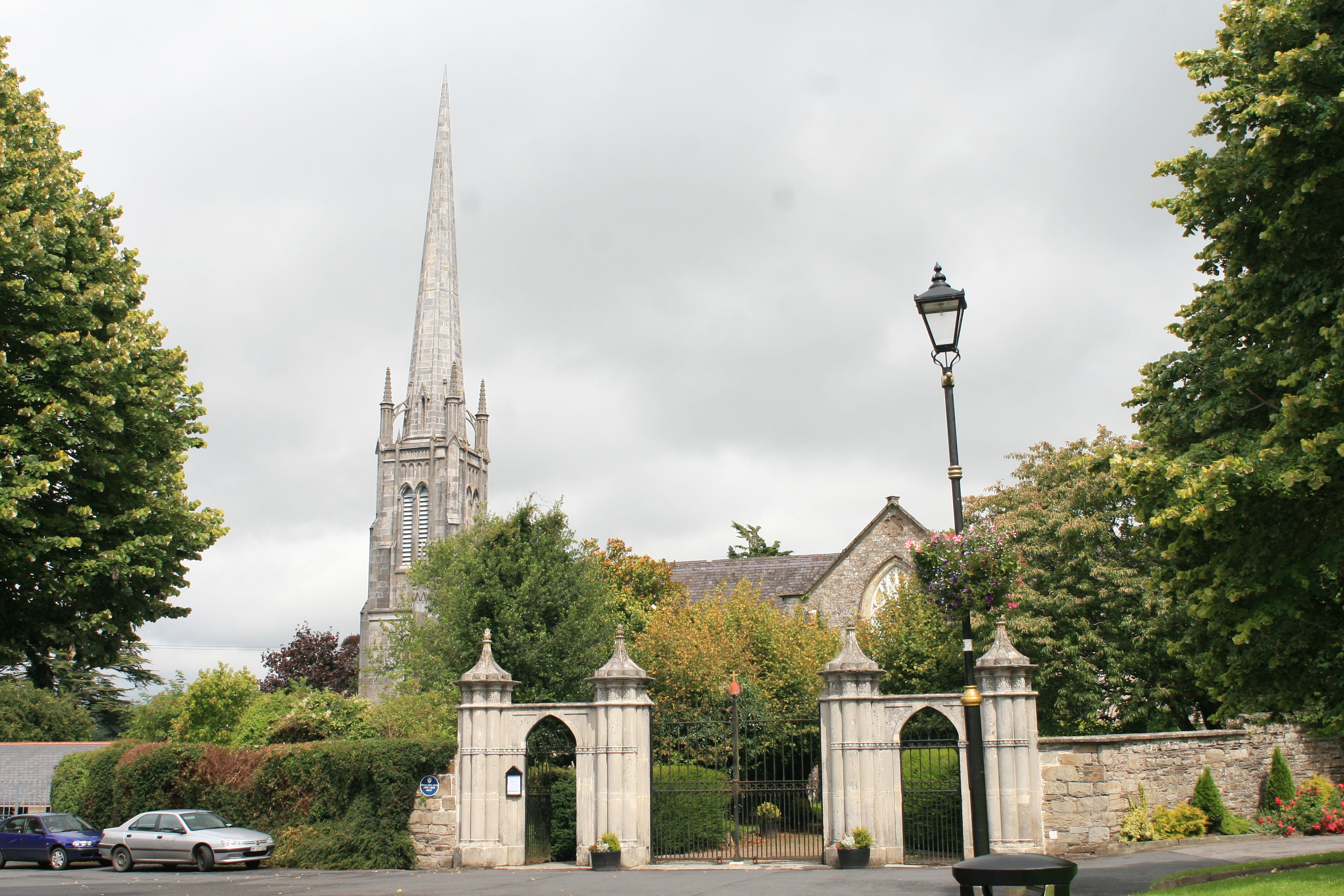
Saint Carthage Cathedral, Lismore

Following his expulsion, Mo Chutu and his monks journeyed to the Déisi, taking refuge along the river bank at the monastic site of Ardfinnan on Déclan's pilgrim path between Cashel to Ardmore. He was confronted by the King of the Déisi but came to a peaceful land agreement here, establishing monastic cells at what became Ardfinnan Abbey, and at Lismore further south on the pilgrim path, where he founded the great Lismore Abbey (in modern County Waterford). The Latin and Irish Lives make very little of Mo Chutu's earlier misfortune and focus instead on the saint's resistance to the oppressive Uí Néill rulers and his joyous reception among the Déisi. He has been portrayed in a heroic light in Indarba Mo Chutu a r-Raithin (The expulsion of Mo Chutu from Rahan).

His foundation at Lismore flourished after his lifetime, eclipsing the reputation of the saint's earlier church. It was able to withstand the Viking depredations which plagued the area and benefited from the generosity of Munster kings, notably the Mac Carthaig of Desmond. In the 5th century, Déclán's earlier foundation of Ardmore aspired to the status of episcopal see in the new diocese, but the privilege ultimately went to Lismore.

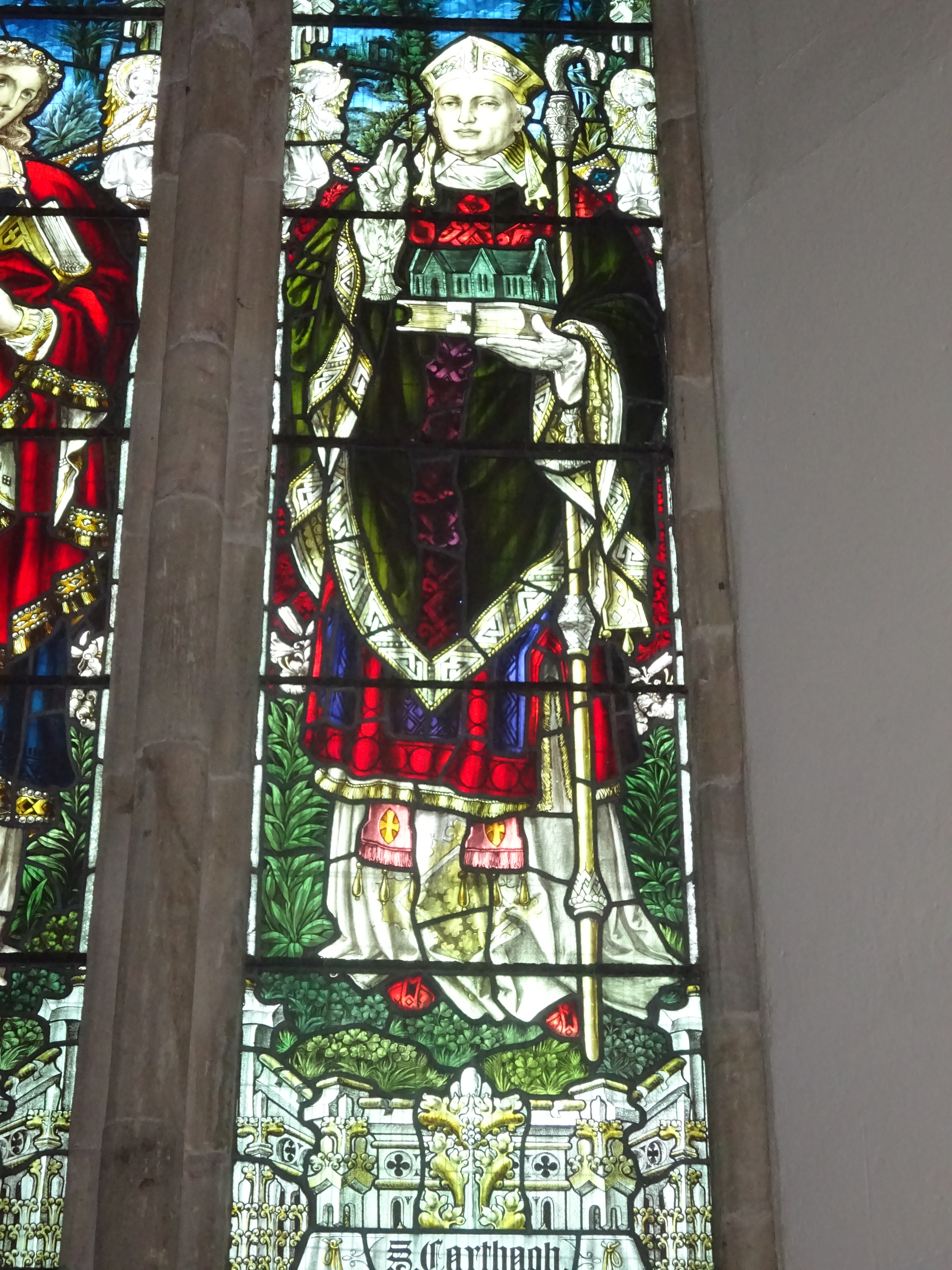
Carthage depicted in stained glass; he holds a bishop's crozier and a model of Lismore Abbey.

His feast day in the Irish martyrologies is 14 May, as well as in the Great Synaxaristes of the Eastern Orthodox Church.

In the present calendar of the Catholic Church in Ireland, in which 14 May is the feast of Saint Matthias, the memorial of Saint Carthage is celebrated on 15 May.

== Sources ==
- Óengus of Tallaght (1905). Stokes, Whitley (ed.). The Martyrology of Oengus the Culdee. Henry Bradshaw Society. Vol. 29. London. pp. 124, 132–3 (14 May), 86–87 (5 March, note).
- Johnston, Elva. "Munster, saints of (act. c. 450 – c. 700)." Oxford Dictionary of National Biography. Oxford University Press, September 2004, online edition May 2008; retrieved 14 December 2008.
