= Lismore Castle =

- Caisleán an Leasa Mhóir
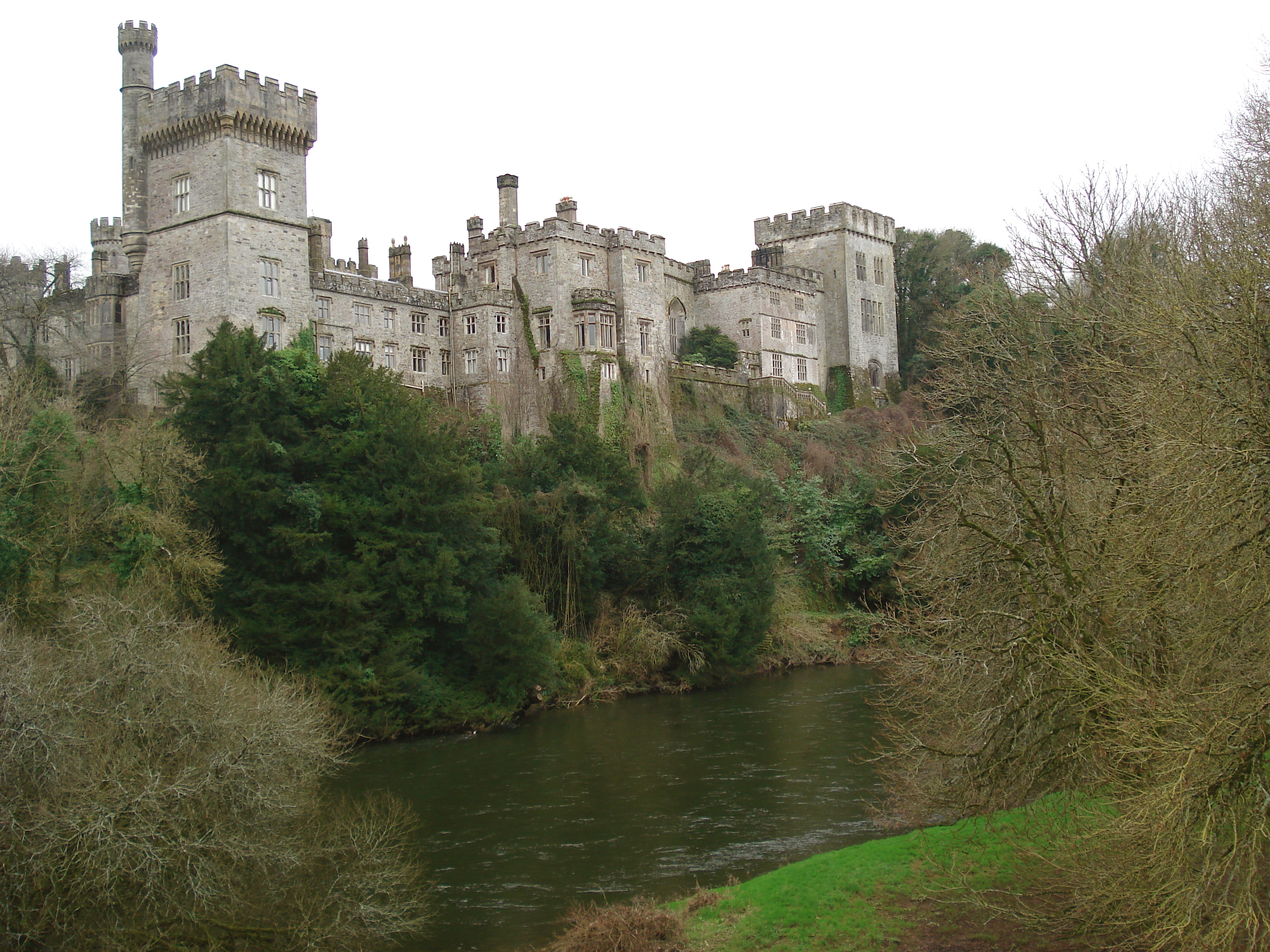
- Lismore Castle, 2006

- Location within Ireland

General information
- Architectural style: Victorian
- Location: Lismore, County Waterford, Ireland
- Coordinates: 52°08′26″N 07°55′57″W
- Elevation: 43 m (141 ft)
- Completed: 1860
- Owner: The 12th Duke of Devonshire; Cavendish family

Design and construction
- Architects: William Atkinson (1811-15); Joseph Paxton, George Henry Stokes (1853-58)
- Developer: William Cavendish, 6th Duke of Devonshire (1849-58)
- Other designers: Augustus Pugin and John Gregory Crace (1849-50) (interiors)
- Quantity surveyor: John Brown (1850-58)

Website
- lismorecastle.com

Lismore Castle (Irish: Caisleán an Leasa Mhóir) is a castle located in the town of Lismore, County Waterford, Ireland. It belonged to the Earls of Desmond, the Earls of Cork, and then to the Cavendish family from 1753. It is currently the Irish home of the Duke of Devonshire. The first castle on the site was built in 1185, and replaced, twice, in the 16th century. It was largely rebuilt in the Gothic style during the mid-nineteenth century for the 6th Duke of Devonshire.

== Early history ==
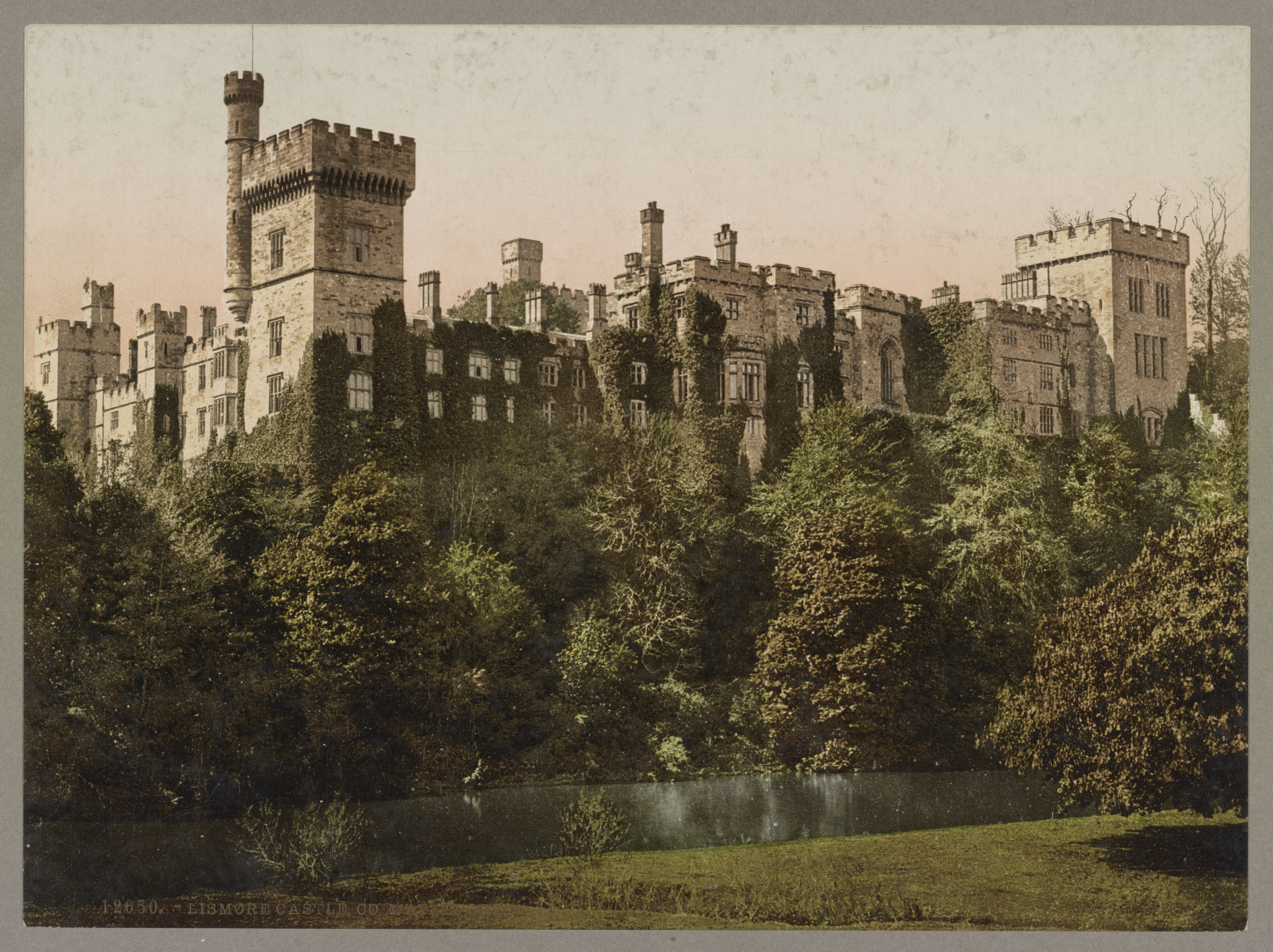
Castles of Munster, Lismore, Waterford

Built as the sister castle to Ardfinnan Castle in 1185 by the Lord of Ireland, Prince John of England to guard the river crossing, the castle site was originally occupied by Lismore Abbey, an important monastery and seat of learning established in the early 7th century.

It was still an ecclesiastical centre when King Henry II of England stayed here in 1171, and except for a brief period after 1185 (when he had assigned his son King John of England to build a 'castellum' here) when it served as the episcopal residence of the local bishop.

It was a possession of the Earls of Desmond, whose lands were broken up during the plantations following the killing of Gerald FitzGerald, 14th Earl of Desmond, in 1583.

In 1589, Lismore was leased and later acquired by Sir Walter Raleigh. Raleigh sold the property during his imprisonment for High Treason in 1602 to Richard Boyle, who was later made the 1st Earl of Cork in 1620.

== Earls of Cork and Burlington ==
Boyle came to the Kingdom of Ireland from the Kingdom of England in 1588 with only twenty-seven pounds in capital and proceeded to amass an extraordinary fortune. After purchasing Lismore he made it his principal seat and transformed it into a magnificent residence with impressive gabled ranges each side of the courtyard. He also built a castellated outer wall and a gatehouse known as the Riding Gate.

The principal apartments were decorated with fretwork plaster ceilings, tapestry hangings, embroidered silks and velvet. It was here in 1626 that Robert Boyle, the Father of Modern Chemistry, the fourteenth of the Earl's fifteen children, was born. The castle eventually descended to the 3rd Earl of Burlington and 4th Earl of Cork (1694–1753), who was a noted influence on Georgian architecture (and is usually known in architectural histories as the Earl of Burlington).

Lismore featured in the Cromwellian wars when, in 1645, a force of Catholic confederacy commanded by Lord Castlehaven sacked the town and castle. Some restoration was carried out by the 1st Earl of Burlington and 2nd Earl of Cork (1612–1698) to make it habitable again, but neither he nor his successors lived at Lismore.

== Dukes of Devonshire ==
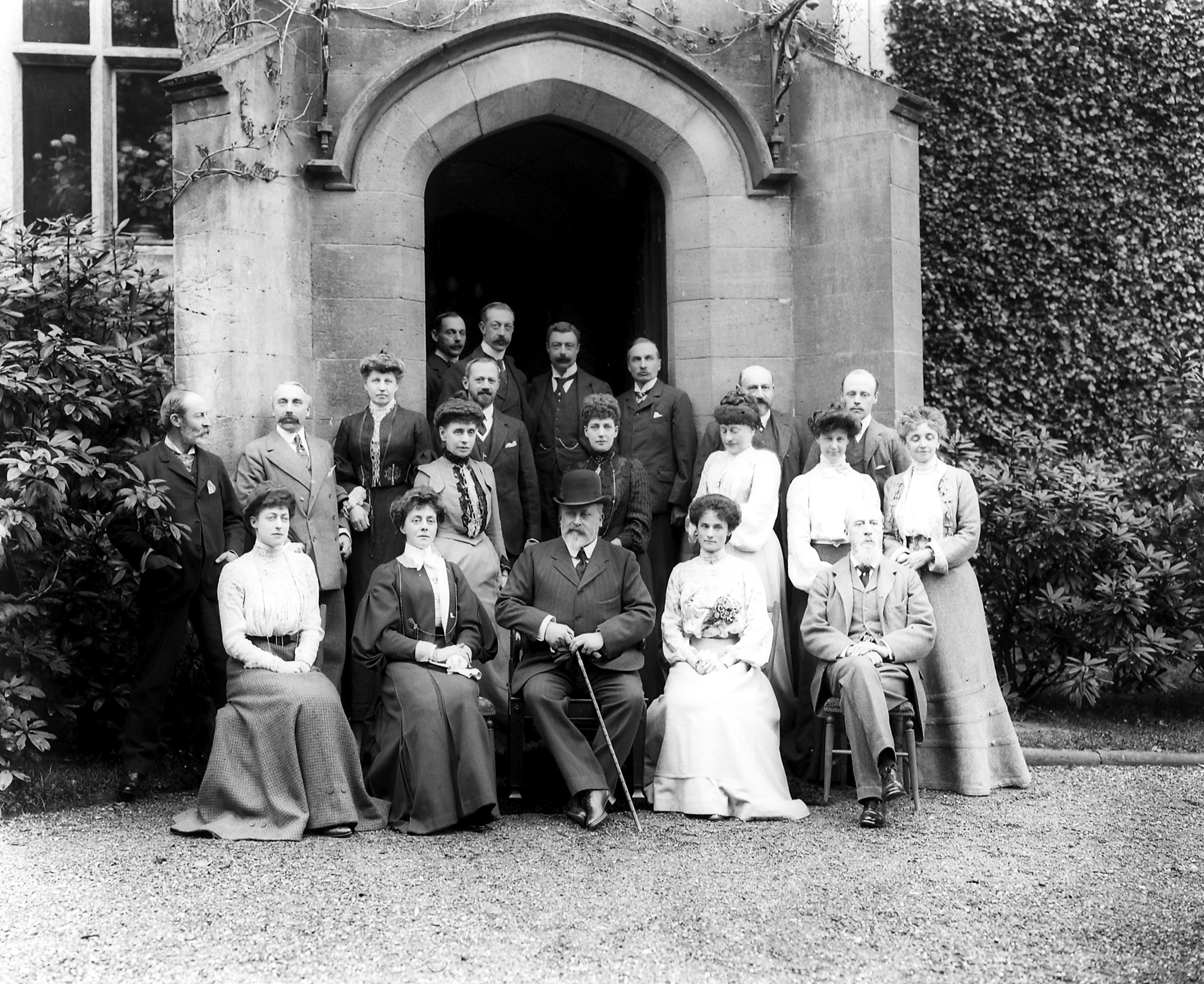
King Edward VII visiting the 8th Duke of Devonshire in May 1904. The 8th Duke had been a very prominent politician, especially when he was styled as Marquess of Hartington. As Lord Hartington, the 8th Duke had been bitterly opposed to Home Rule for Ireland in the 1880s.

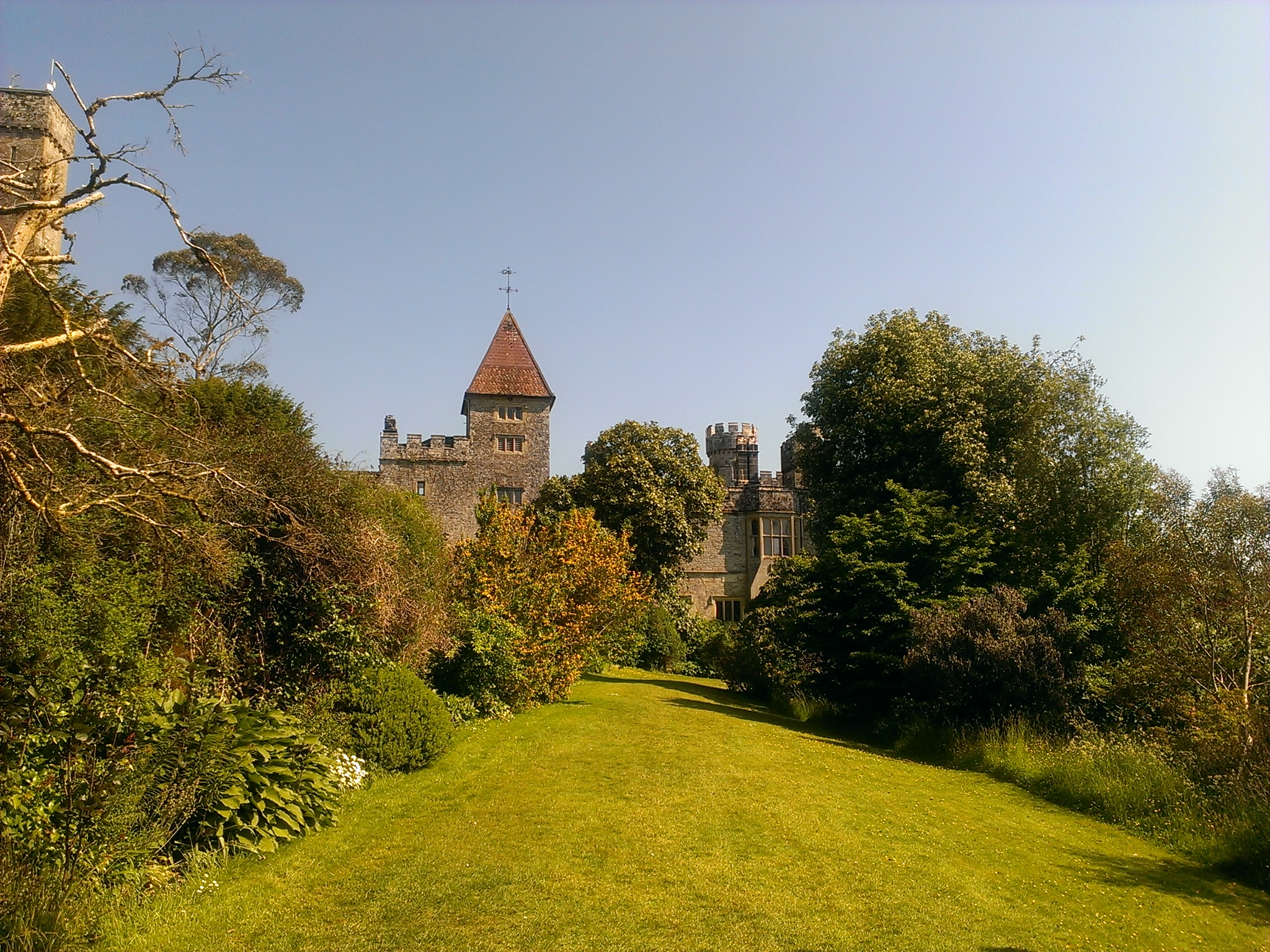
Lismore estate entrance

The castle (along with other Boyle properties – Chiswick House, Burlington House, Bolton Abbey and Londesborough Hall) was acquired by the Cavendish family in 1753 when Lady Charlotte Boyle (1731–1754), the daughter and heiress of the 3rd Earl of Burlington and 4th Earl of Cork, married the Marquess of Hartington, who later became, in 1755, the 4th Duke of Devonshire (1720–1764), a future Prime Minister of the Kingdom of Great Britain. Their son, the 5th Duke (1748–1811), carried out improvements at Lismore, notably the bridge across the River Blackwater in 1775, which was designed by Cork-born architect Thomas Ivory.

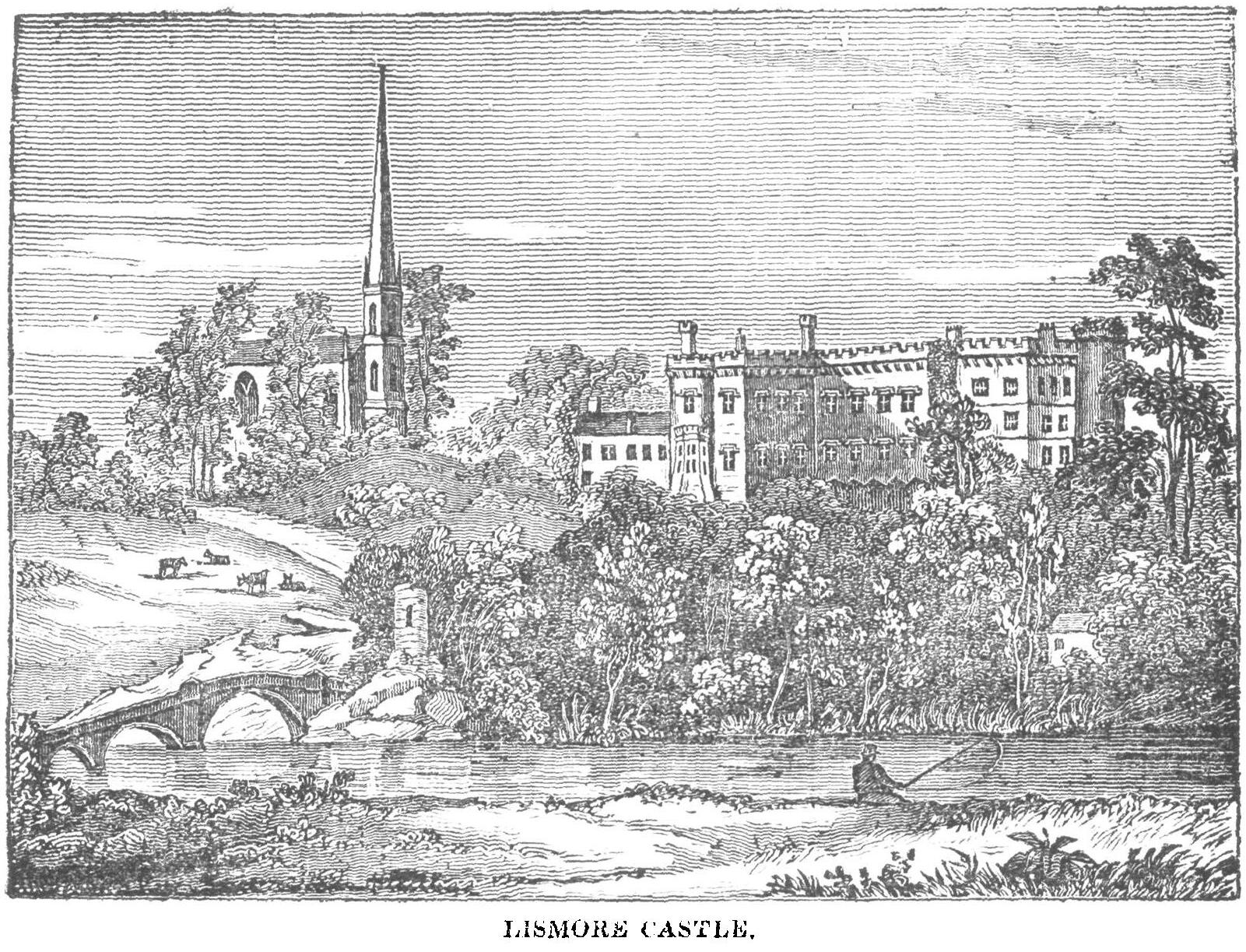
A view of the castle in 1835, the Dublin Penny Journal

The 6th Duke (1790–1858), commonly known as "the Bachelor Duke", was responsible for the castle's present appearance. He began transforming the castle into a fashionable "quasi-feudal ultra-regal fortress" as soon as he succeeded his father in 1811, engaging the architect William Atkinson from 1812 to 1822 to rebuild the castle in the Gothic style, using cut stone shipped over from Derbyshire. Lismore was always the Bachelor Duke's favourite residence, but as he grew older his love for the place developed into a passion.

In 1850 he engaged his architect Sir Joseph Paxton, the designer of the Crystal Palace, to carry out improvements and additions to the castle on a magnificent scale – so much so that the present skyline is largely Paxton's work. At this time, J. G. Crace of London, the leading maker of Gothic Revival furniture, and his partner, the leading architect Augustus Pugin, were commissioned to transform the ruined chapel of the old Bishop's Palace into a medieval-style banqueting hall, with a huge perpendicular stained-glass window, choir-stalls and Gothic stenciling on the walls and roof timbers.

The chimney-piece, which was exhibited at the Medieval Court of the Great Exhibition of 1851, was also designed by Pugin (and Myers) but was originally intended for Horsted Place in Sussex; it was rejected because it was too elaborate and subsequently bought for Lismore – the Barchard family emblems later replaced with the present Irish inscription Cead Mille Fáilte: 'a hundred thousand welcomes'. Pugin also designed other chimney-pieces and furnishings in the castle and, after his death in 1851, Crace continued to supply furnishings in the Puginesque manner.

In 1858, the Cavendish family sponsored a new bridge over the Blackwater, which replaced the one built in 1775. This new construction followed designs by Charles Tarrant and was done by E. P. Nagle and C. H. Hunt.

After the death of the 6th Duke in 1858, Lismore remained substantially unaltered. It became the home of a younger son of the 9th Duke, Lord Charles Cavendish, who married Adele Astaire, the sister and former dancing partner of Fred Astaire. After her husband's death in 1944 and her remarriage in 1947, Adele continued to use the castle until shortly before her own death in 1981.

The castle was only used by the 11th Duke of Devonshire for brief annual visits, generally over Easter. In the last years of his tenure it was made available for short-term rent. The 12th Duke, who succeeded to the title in 2004, continues to live primarily on the family's Chatsworth estate.

His son and heir, Lord Burlington, who has an apartment in the castle, has been given management of it, and in 2005 converted the derelict west range into a contemporary art gallery, known as Lismore Castle Arts. The remainder of the interior is not open to the public, but is available for hire by groups of up to twenty-three visitors.

The castle features gardens, which are open to the public. The upper garden is a 17th-century walled garden, while much of the informal lower garden was designed in the 19th century. Under Lord Burlington the planting has been enhanced, and contemporary sculpture added, including works by Sir Antony Gormley, Marzia Colonna and Eilís O'Connell.
