= Labbamolaga Church =

- Leaba Molaga
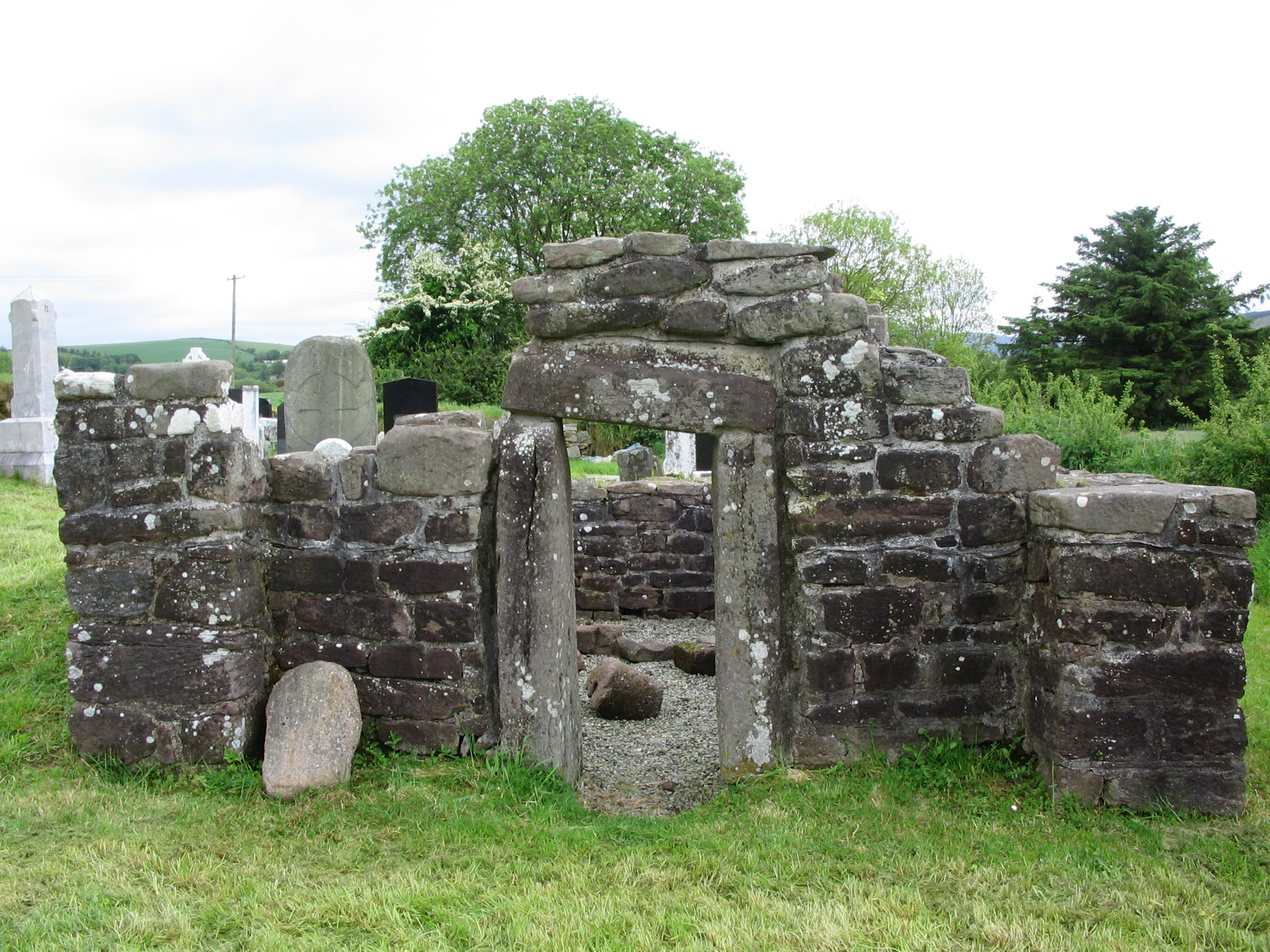

- Location within Ireland
- 52.310764°N 8.347678°W
- Location: Labbamolaga Middle, Mitchelstown, County Cork
- Country: Ireland
- Denomination: Pre-Reformation Catholic

History
- Dedication: St. Molaga

Architecture
- Functional status: ruined
- Style: Celtic Christian
- Closed: by 16th century

Specifications
- Length: 11.8 m (39 ft)
- Width: 7.2 m (24 ft)
- Materials: stone, mortar

Administration
- Diocese: Cloyne

National monument of Ireland
- Official name: Labbamolaga
- Reference no.: 18

Labbamolaga Church is a medieval church and National Monument located in County Cork, Ireland.

== Location ==
Labbamolaga Church is located 7.3 km (4.5 mi) northwest of Mitchelstown, on the east bank of the Monaheancree Stream.

== History ==
Adjacent are four megalithic standing stones, erected during the Bronze Age and perhaps part of a stone circle. Local lore claims that they were four thieves who stole the chalice and relics and were turned to stone as punishment. In the 7th century AD Saint Molaga founded a church and monastery here; he also gives his name to Timoleague and is traditionally held to have introduced beekeeping to Ireland. In 1897, William Copeland Borlase was the first to claim that Molaga is most likely a Christianisation of the Celtic god Lugh, the same being true of saints Molua and Lachtene.

The oratory, built c. AD 900, was built as a tomb shrine to the founder. A limestone slab with carved volute marks Leaba Molaige – Molaga's Bed. It is called in the Book of Lismore Eidhnen Molaige – "Molaige's ivy-covered church." Local people used to touch St. Molaga's tombstone to cure rheumatism.

The church was ruined by the 16th century.

== Description ==
=== Church ===
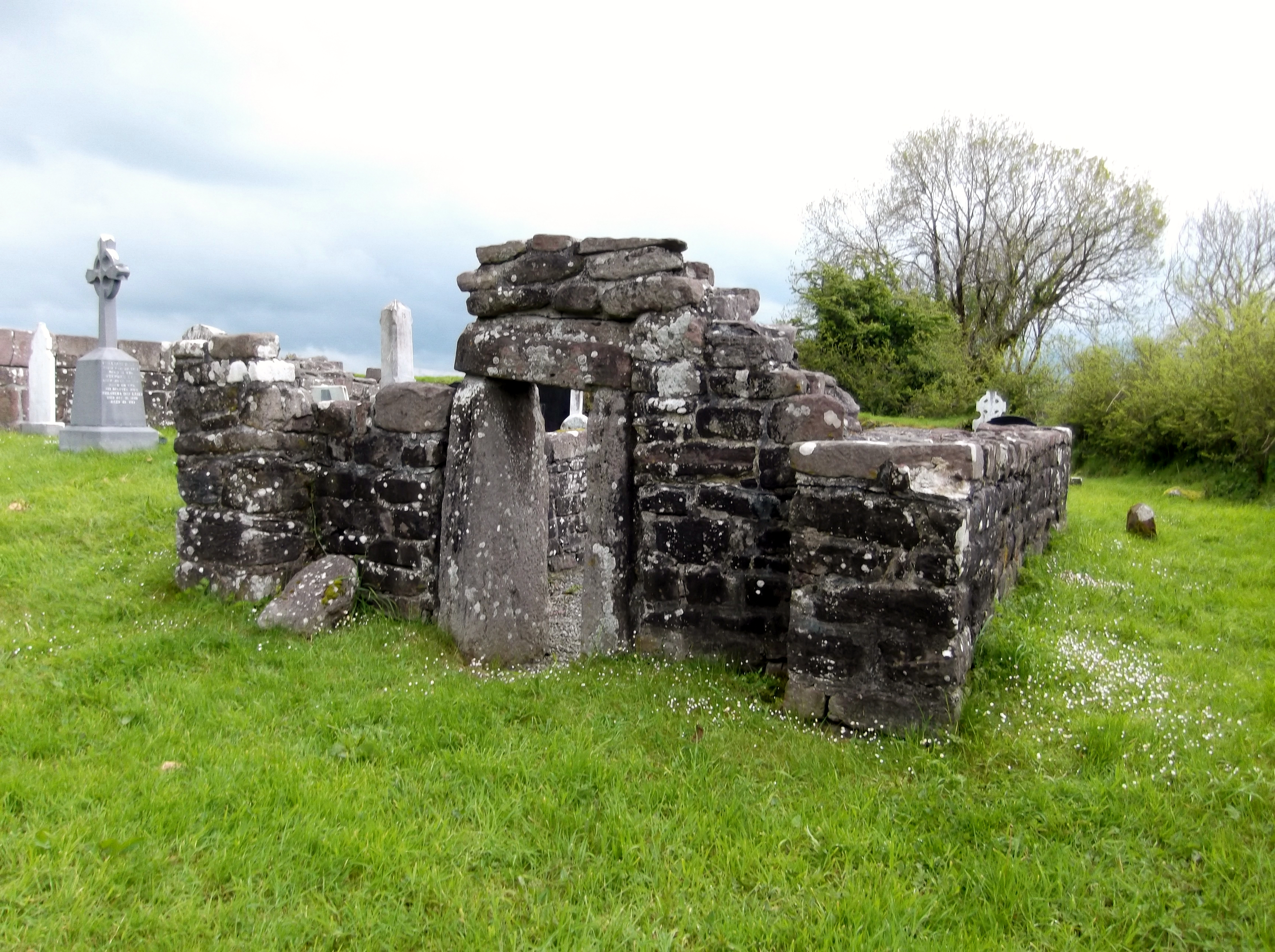
Oblique view

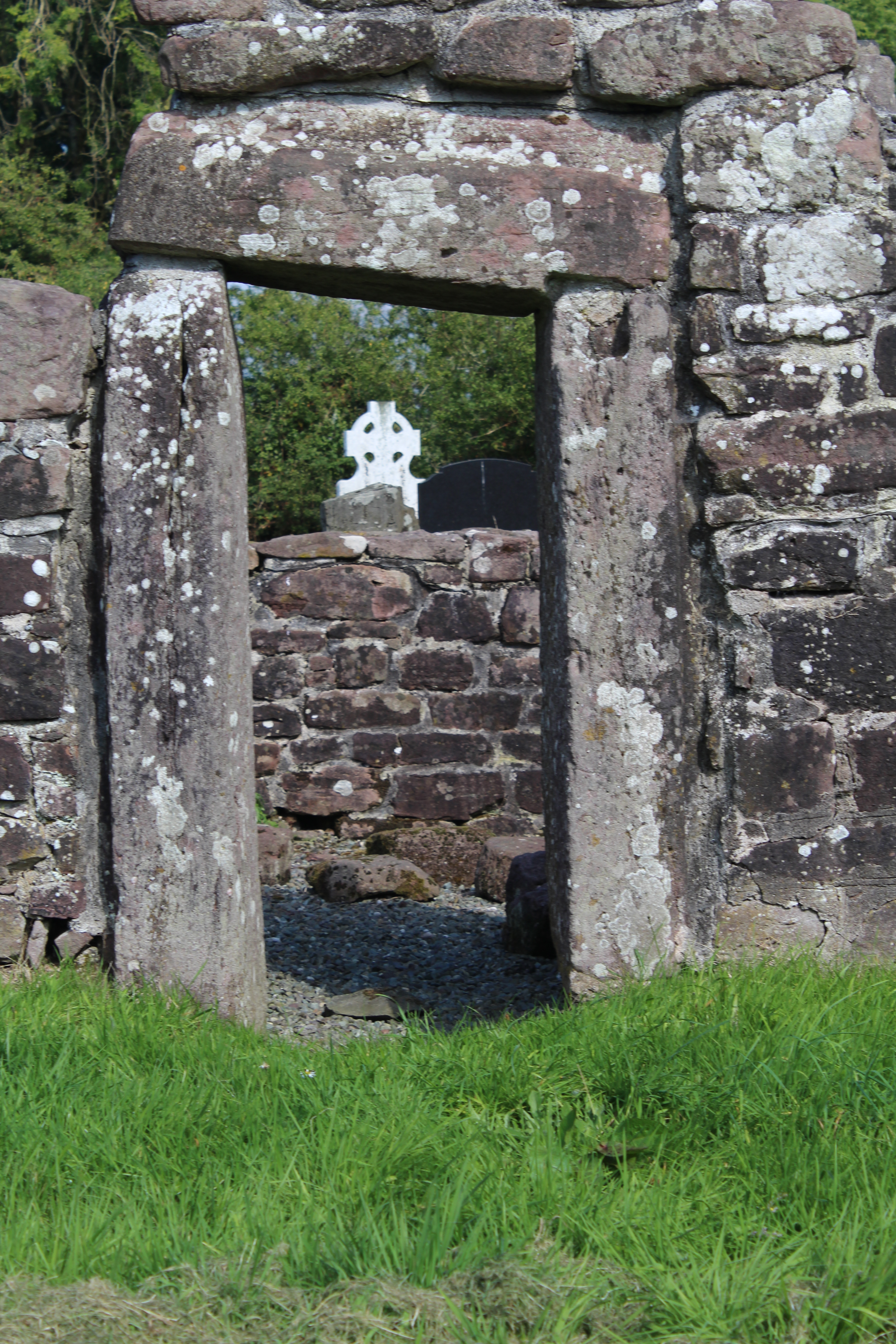
Doorway

The church is a large rectangular Romanesque building.

=== Oratory ===
The oratory is rectangular (6.33 × 4.45 m) with antae. The west door is formed by three large stones which may have been taken from the nearby megaliths, signifying Christian replacement of the old gods.

=== Cross Slab ===
A cross slab in the graveyard bears a Celtic cross in low relief on the west face and a Latin cross on the east face.

=== Cursing-stones ===
Several bullauns are located under a slab and were known as clocha mealachta (stones of rebuke).

== See also ==
- Timoleague Friary
