= R603 road =

R603 road may refer to:

- R603 road (Ireland)
- R603 (South Africa)
