= R602 road =

R602 road may refer to:

- R602 road (Ireland)
- R602 road (South Africa)
