= Abbeymahon Abbey =

Ruined Cistercian abbey in Meath, Ireland

- Mainisitr Ó mBána
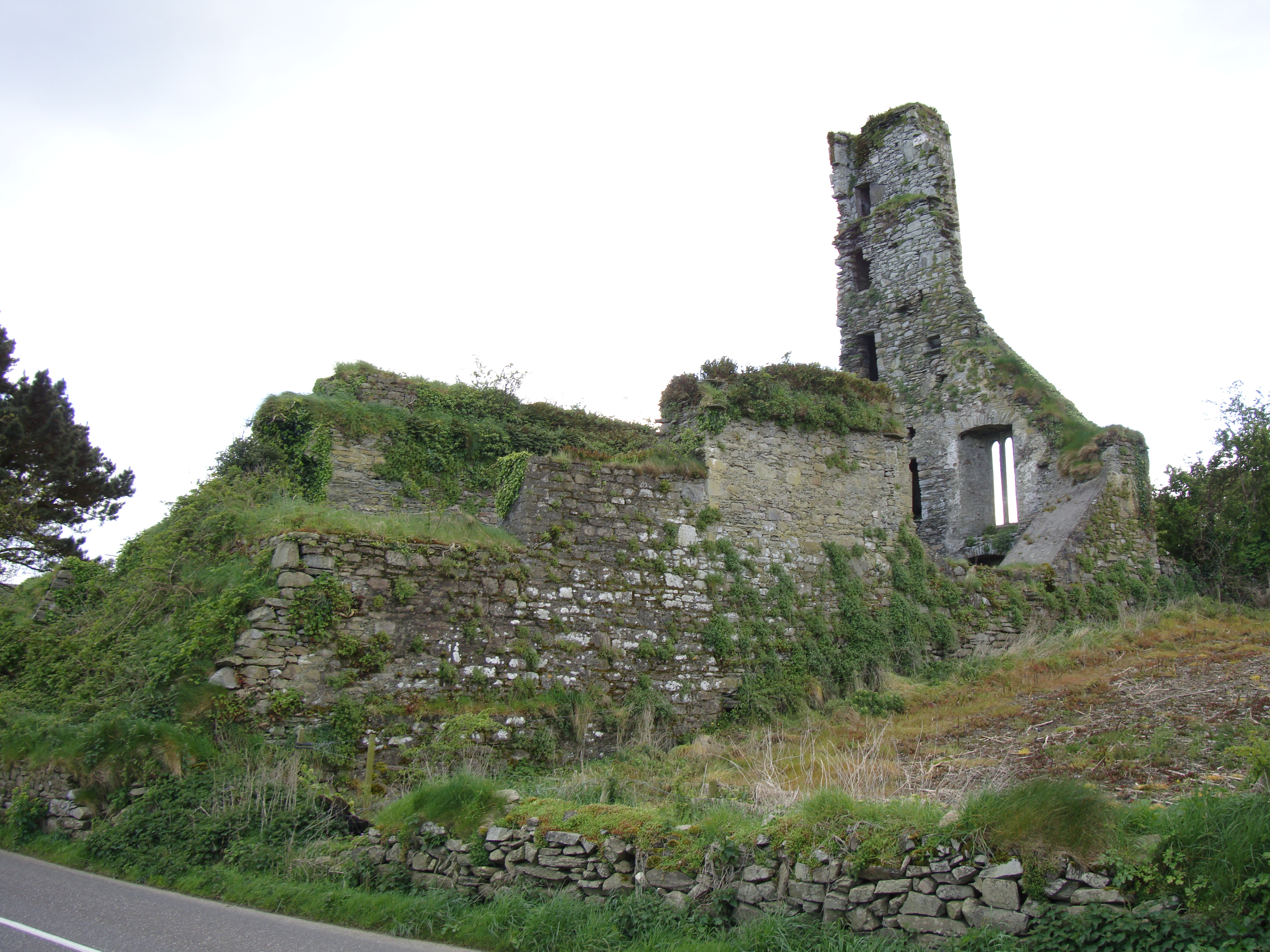
- Interactive map of Abbeymahon Abbey

Monastery information
- Other names: St Mary de Fonte Vivo, Fonte Vivo, Mainisitr Ó mBána, Fons Vivus
- Order: Cistercian
- Established: 1172
- Disestablished: 1542
- Mother house: Baltinglass
- Diocese: Diocese of Cork and Ross

People
- Founder: Diarmait Mac Cormac Mac Carthaig

Site
- Location: Abbeymahon, Cork
- Coordinates: 51°38′14″N 8°44′10″W
- Public access: Unknown

Abbeymahon Abbey (Irish: Mainistir Ó mBána), also known as The Cistercian Abbey of St Mary de Fonte Vivo, and as the Abbey of Sancto Mauro is a ruined medieval Cistercian abbey situated near Timoleague, County Cork, Ireland.

Due to a "dearth of documentary evidence", little is known about Abbeymahon Abbey, though it was a flourishing and wealthy abbey up until its suppression in the 16th century.

== History ==
Abbeymahon Abbey was built in the 1270s to replace an abbey that was founded in 1172 by Diarmait Mac Cormac Mac Carthaig, king of Desmond, in the neighbouring townland of Aghavanister. This original settlement was populated by a group of Cistercian monks from Baltinglass. Close to a century later, the monks of Aghavanister decided to move to a new site; it is possible that the time had come to renew the abbey buildings and the monks took the opportunity to find a more spacious site. The monks had moved to Abbeymahon by 1278, when Diarmait MacCarthaig, son of Domnall Cairbrech, was buried in the ‘new monastery’. The new site is on the estuary of the Argideen River, just over a mile east south-east of Timoleague, on the road to Courtmacsherry. This abbey was later known as the Abbey of Sancto Mauro, though it is unlikely to have been connected St Maurus, and this is likely a corruption of the original name for the abbey, the meaning of which has been lost. It was also given the Cistercian name De Fonte Vivo. Though it was thought in the 19th century that the abbey of Sancto Mauro / De Fonte Vivo was not the same as the ruins present in Abbeymahon, this is not the case.

The abbots of Abbeymahon were rebuked several times in the thirteenth century for not attending the General Chapter when summoned. It is not surprising that the abbots refused to attend considering that the journey was extremely lengthy and expensive. In the taxation of 1302-1306 the income of the abbey was valued at £4, which would hardly have covered the cost of the journey. The annual income of the abbey during the 15th and 16th centuries was still a meager amount, estimated at just £18, with a potential income of £34 during peace time.

At the time of the Dissolution it was found that the abbey had been functioning as the parish church 'since time immemorial' and that all other buildings were being used by the local farmer. It is likely that the abbey was protected by James de Barry, the 4th Viscount Buttevant, as it was not dissolved until some point between 1570 and 1587. In a Henrician survey of the abbeys taken as part of the dissolution of the monasteries, Abbeymahon was listed as the most valuable monastery in the diocese of Ross. In 1568 the property was leased to the Viscount Buttevant and in 1584 the lease was transferred to Nicholas Walsh, Justice of Munster. The site was granted "forever" to Nicholas Walsh in 1587, with some additional place names appearing on this grant.

== Architecture ==
Little remains of the abbey, which was a small structure to begin with. Only parts of the nave, choir, and transept arches remain today. The site of the monastery is unusual among Cistercian foundations in that it is not located by a steam or fresh-water river as is typical, instead being located on the shore of a salt-water estuary. A lack of architectural features such as doors or windows among the remains makes it difficult to ascertain by physical means any physical changes the abbey may have undergone.

== See also ==
- List of abbeys and priories in Ireland (County Cork)
