= R606 road (Ireland) =

Regional road in Ireland

R606 road
- Bóthar R606
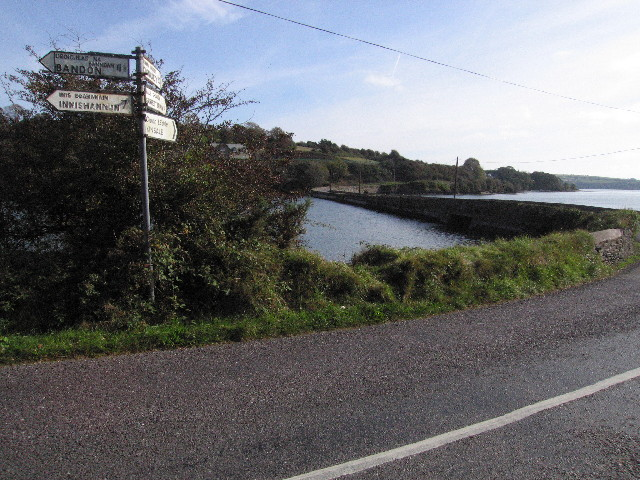
- R606 road and bridge at Whitecastle Creek, a tributary of the River Bandon

Route information
- Length: 5.5 km (3.4 mi)

Major junctions
- From: R605 at Ballythomas Cross, County Cork
- Crosses River Bandon
- To: R600 at Archdeacon Duggan Bridge

Location
- Country: Ireland

Highway system
- Roads in Ireland; Motorways; Primary; Secondary; Regional
← R605	→ R607

The R606 road is a regional road in County Cork, Ireland. It travels from the R605 at Ballythomas Cross south to the R600 at Archdeacon Duggan Bridge near Kinsale. The road's southern section runs along Whitecastle Creek. The R606 is 5.5 kilometres (3.4 mi) long.
