= R603 road (Ireland) =

Regional road in Ireland

R603 road
- Bóthar R603
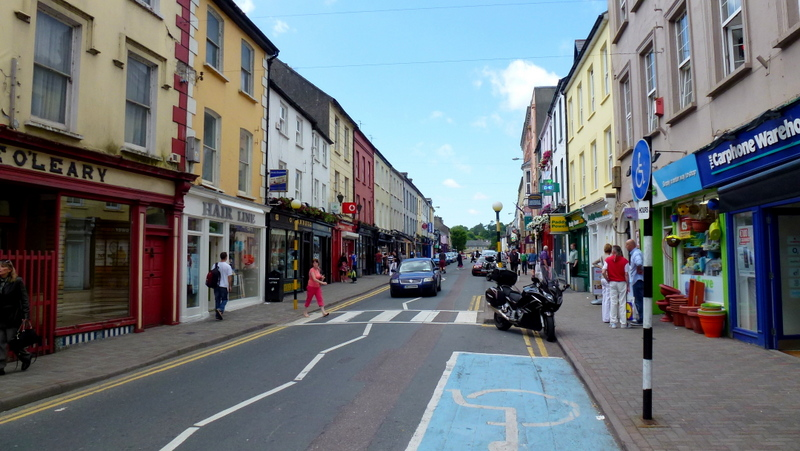
- South Main Street, Bandon, on the R603

Route information
- Length: 13.0 km (8.1 mi)

Major junctions
- From: R586 at Bandon, County Cork
- N71 at New Road, Bandon; N71 at Relief Road, Bandon
- To: R600 at Garranereagh

Location
- Country: Ireland

Highway system
- Roads in Ireland; Motorways; Primary; Secondary; Regional
← R602	→ R604

The R603 road is a regional road in County Cork, Ireland. It travels from the R586 at Bandon Bridge in Bandon south to the R600 at Garranereagh, via Kilbrittain. In Bandon, the route is split on joining and leaving the N71 road. The road is 13.0 kilometres (8.1 mi) long.
