= R605 road (Ireland) =

Regional road in Ireland

R605 road
- Bóthar R605
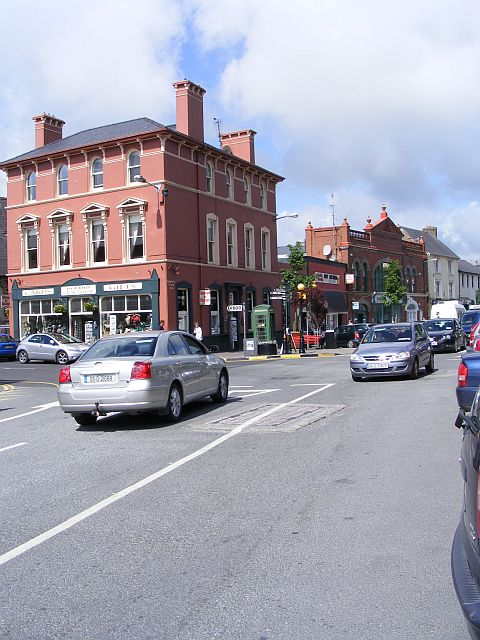
- Pearse Street, Kinsale, on the R605

Route information
- Length: 13.7 km (8.5 mi)

Major junctions
- From: N71 at Main Street, Innishannon, County Cork
- R606 at Ballythomas Cross; R607 at Abbey Lands, Kinsale

- To: R600 at Long Quay, Kinsale

Location
- Country: Ireland

Highway system
- Roads in Ireland; Motorways; Primary; Secondary; Regional
← R604	→ R606

The R605 road is a regional road in County Cork, Ireland. It travels from the N71 road at Innishannon to Kinsale, via the village of Dunderrow. The road is 13.7 kilometres (8.5 mi) long.
