= R604 road (Ireland) =

Regional road in Ireland

R604 road
- Bóthar R604
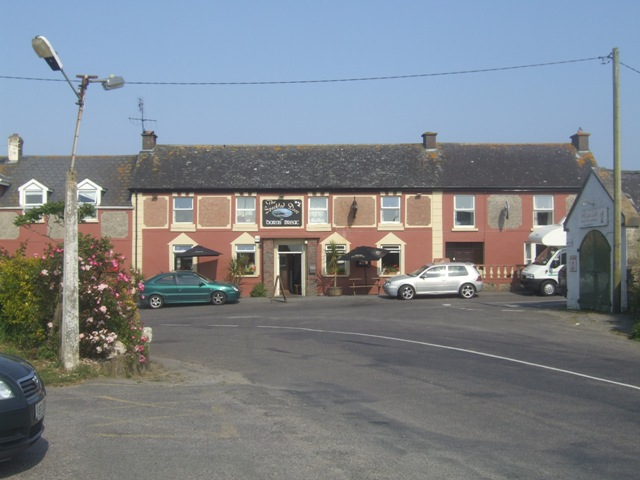
- On the R604, Old Head of Kinsale

Route information
- Length: 10.5 km (6.5 mi)

Major junctions
- From: R600 at Kilmore Cross, County Cork

- To: R600 at Barrell Cross

Location
- Country: Ireland

Highway system
- Roads in Ireland; Motorways; Primary; Secondary; Regional
| ← R603 | → R605 |

The R604 road is a regional road in County Cork, Ireland. It travels in a loop from the R600 road near Ballinspittle south to the Old Head of Kinsale and then north again to rejoin the R600. The road is 10.5 kilometres (6.5 mi) long.
