= Timoleague Friary =

Ruined Franciscan friary in Cork, Ireland

- Mainistir Thigh Molaga
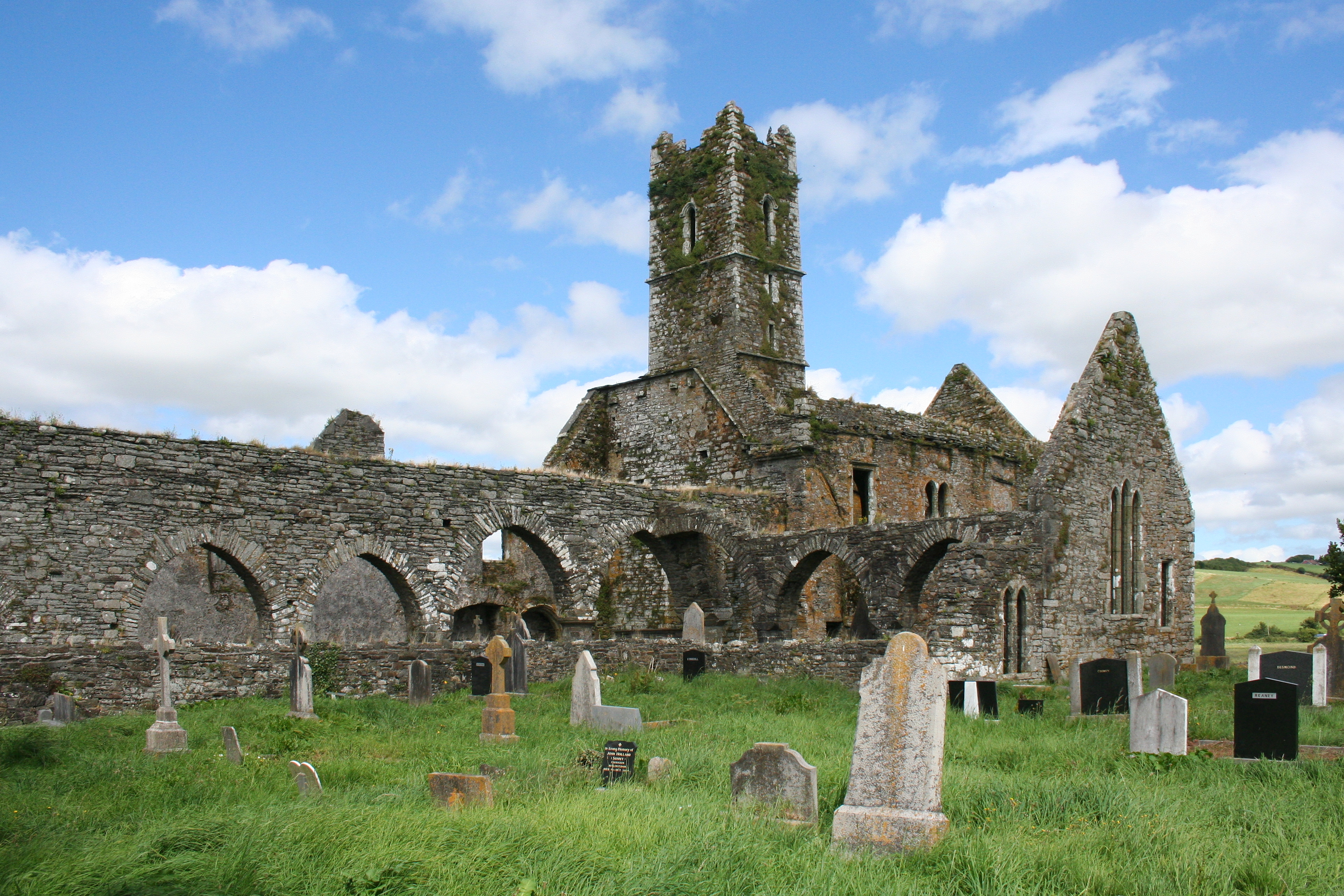
- Interactive map of Timoleague Friary

Monastery information
- Order: Franciscans
- Denomination: Roman Catholic Church
- Established: c.1240
- Disestablished: 1631
- Diocese: Cork and Ross

People
- Founder: Domhnall Got MacCarthy or William de Barry
- Important associated figures: Saint Molaga

Architecture
- Status: Inactive
- Style: Early English Gothic

Site
- Location: Timoleague, County Cork, Ireland
- Coordinates: 51.64250°N 8.76306°W
- Public access: Yes

Timoleague Friary (Irish: Mainistir Thigh Molaga), also known as Timoleague Abbey, is a ruined medieval Franciscan friary in Timoleague, County Cork, Ireland, on the banks of the Argideen River overlooking Courtmacsherry Bay. It was built on the site of an early Christian monastic site founded by Saint Molaga, from whom the town of Timoleague derives its name. The present remains date from roughly the turn of the fourteenth century and were burnt down by Crown forces during the Irish Confederate Wars in the mid-seventeenth century, at which point it was an important ecclesiastical centre that engaged in significant trade with Spain.

The friary is the largest medieval ruin in West Cork and one of the few early Franciscan friaries in Ireland to have substantial ruins. It is claustral in layout, and built in the Early English Gothic architectural style. It contains several elements atypical of Franciscan architecture of the period, including wall passages and exterior access to its upper floor. It was significantly altered in the early 16th and early 17th centuries. Several historical artefacts are associated with the friary, and during the Romantic era it was depicted in several notable artworks.

== History ==
=== Monastic site ===
The friary sits on a monastic site dedicated to Saint Molaga dating to either the 6th or 7th century. According to legend, this settlement was originally to be formed a mile west of Timoleague, but all work done on that site by day would fall down by morning. Interpreting this as God's will that the friary be built elsewhere, Molaga supposedly placed a blessed candle on a sheaf of corn, and set it down the Argideen River, building his settlement on the spot that it came ashore, in an area overlooking Courtmacsherry Bay. The town derives its Irish name, Teach Molaga or "Molaga's House" from the saint.

=== Foundation and early history ===
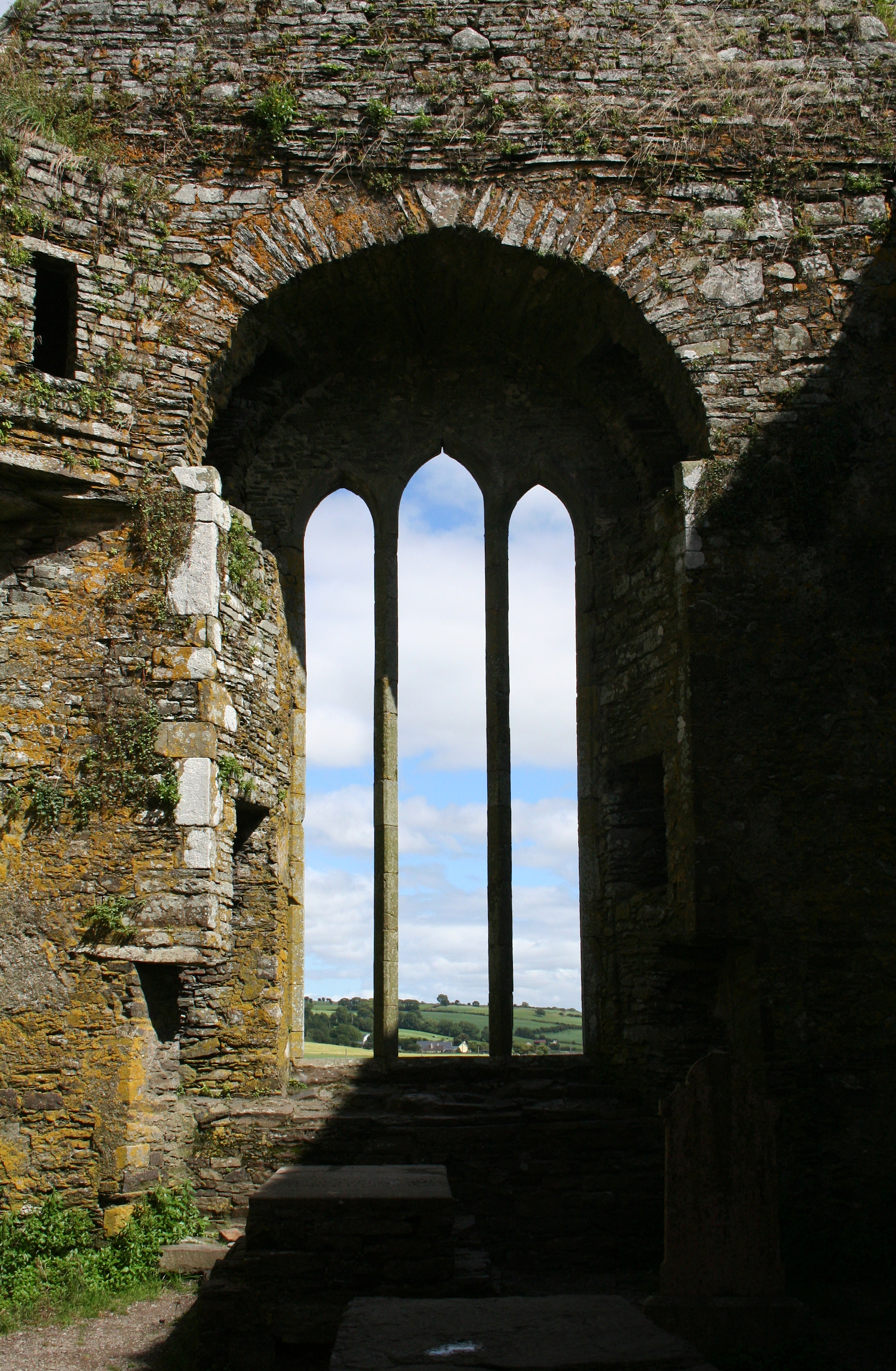
North-facing church window seen from the interior of the friary

The date of foundation by the Franciscans is disputed. Documentary evidence places the foundation of the friary between 1307 and 1316, though physical evidence suggests that a preexisting 13th-century building was incorporated into the site. According to the Annals of the Four Masters, the friary was founded in 1240 by the MacCarthy Reagh family. This has been identified as possibly being too early. Some sources ascribe this claimed foundation to Domhnall Got MacCarthy, while others claim that Got MacCarthy merely expanded the friary anywhere between 1312 and 1366. Domhnall's grandson, Domhnall Glas MacCarthy, is also thought to have been a patron of the friary. Samuel Lewis, in A Topographical Dictionary of Ireland... (1837) writes that the MacCarthy's founded the friary in 1312. The friary's foundation has also been attributed to the Anglo-Norman de Barry family in the early 14th century. Though the friars were well established in Timoleague by 1320, the earliest surviving parts of the ruined friary date from later in the 14th century. It is likely that they were based in Timoleague Castle prior to the construction of the friary.

By the 15th century, the friary was recognised as a centre of learning, and also as an important ecclesiastical centre. In 1460, Timoleague became one of the first houses in the Franciscan order to recognise the observantine reform. Tadhg Mac Cárthaigh, also known as "Blessed Thaddeus", is said to have been educated by the friars in Timoleague around this time. According to the Annals of Ulster, in 1505 Patrick Ó Feidhil, a famous preacher in Ireland and Scotland, was buried in the friary.

An important patron of the church was Bishop John Edmond de Courcy, along with his nephew James, 8th Baron Kingsale. They funded the construction of the Gothic style bell tower, the infirmary, the library, and one of the dormitories. De Courcy had been a friar in Timoleague before being made a bishop. The tower was added between 1510 and 1518. They also contributed to the friary's collection of plate. John de Courcy was buried in the transept of the friary, but in the Cromwellian period his grave was desecrated and his bones thrown into the estuary.

Despite the dissolution of the monasteries in 1540 by Henry VIII, the friars remained in Timoleague. In 1568, the friary was seized by crown forces, and in 1577 was granted to James de Barry, 4th Viscount Buttevant. Despite this, Timoleague remained an important centre for the training of the novitiate until the late 1580s. In 1590, the Protestant Bishop of Cork ordered materials to be taken from the friar's mill to be used in the construction of a new mill he was building, but the river flooded and swept away all progress on the new mill. In 1596, the friary's wooden cells were removed and were being transported by ship, but the ship sank in a storm. After the succession of James I, the friary was reclaimed by Catholics in 1603, and was repaired in its entirety by the end of 1604. During these repairs, significant changes were made to the architecture of the friary.

=== Abandonment and destruction ===
In 1612, Bishop Lyons came to Timoleague to disperse the friars but was repelled by an Irish force led by Daniel O'Sullivan. Though the friary had reportedly been re-edified by 1613, by the time of Donatus Mooney's visit in 1616, the friary could no longer be considered genuinely inhabited. In 1629, four years after the death of King James, Richard Boyle was named Lord Justice and instigated the closure of religious buildings across Cork, putting increasing pressure on the friary. It is assumed, however, that the friary was already largely abandoned by the Franciscans by this point, as the guardian appointed to the friary, Eugenius Fildaeus, was appointed in Limerick, in Loco refugii. By 1631 the friary had been largely plundered by Protestant settlers.

Despite these accounts, the friary was reportedly renowned for its School of Philosophy, established in 1620 and led by Owen O'Fihelly. Furthermore, in 1629 Mícheál Ó Cléirigh reportedly transcribed material from the Book of Lismore in the friary library.

The friary was eventually burnt down by crown forces in July 1642, when a force led by Lord Kinelmeaky failed to capture Timoleague Castle and instead burnt the friary and much of the town. Franciscan houses were commonly founded at trading ports, and Timoleague is no exception: the friary at one time engaged in significant trade with France, and in particular, Spain. The monks likely traded Irish agricultural goods such as hides, butter, timber, and corn in exchange for wine: an account of the burning of the friary states that: "We burnt all the towne, and their great Abbey, in which was some thousand barrels of wine." The destruction of the friary led to a significant downturn in the financial development of the town.

=== As ruins ===
After the friary was burnt, local families began to bury their dead within the friary regardless of status, something which previously had only been done for prominent local families. Despite the burning of the friary, the Franciscan community of Timoleague survived for close to two centuries. In 1696 four friars were reportedly living in the ruined monastery. Though the Franciscan community dispersed by the mid-eighteenth century, individual friars remained in the area for several more decades. The last Franciscan friar working in the area was Fr Edmund Tobin (also known as Bonaventure Tobin), who died circa 1822. The Franciscans appointed titular guardians of the friary up until 1872. The last guardian of Timoleague friary was Patrick Carey. Interest in the friary was renewed during the Romantic era of the early 19th century, and many paintings and sketches of the friary exist from this period. On 15 January 1848, Fr Matt Horgan, writing under the pen-name "Viator", wrote the following which was released in the Cork Examiner:

"The walls [of the friary] are washed by the tide and some large breaches are already made in the burying ground, much to the disgrace of the lord of the soil, who must be either some heartless absentee, or a Gothic resident, having no feeling of fatherland; irrespective of its history or monuments, thinking only of bullocks, and knowing nothing, and caring less for the arts; blind to the beauties, with heart closed against the romance and poetry of the glorious past, and its mute but still eloquent memorials."

Soon after the publication of these remarks, Colonel Robert Travers, the so-called "lord of the soil", had the walls of the friary grounds replaced, and a road built between them and the sea, all at his own expense. In 1891, mass was celebrated in the friary for the first time since it was burnt down 249 years prior. One of the Timoleague chalices (the Dale-Browne Chalice) was used on the occasion. In 1892, Denham Franklin wrote that

"The preservation of the abbey is mainly due to the care bestowed on it by the family of the present proprietor of Timoleague, Mr. Robert Travers, who did not allow the depredations unfortunately too common on our ancient buildings."

In 1920, in response to the murder of three police officers by Irish nationalists, British soldiers desecrated the friary's burial ground. Burial vaults were opened, and the flags that had been draped over the coffins within were torn and cast aside. Coffins were opened, and in some cases, human remains were left visible.

The friary has been listed as a discovery point on the Wild Atlantic Way since it was established in 2014. Irish-language writer Máire Ní Shíthe was interred in the friary in an unmarked grave in 1955. In 2016 the location of her burial was identified, and a commemorative stone placed above it.

== Architecture ==
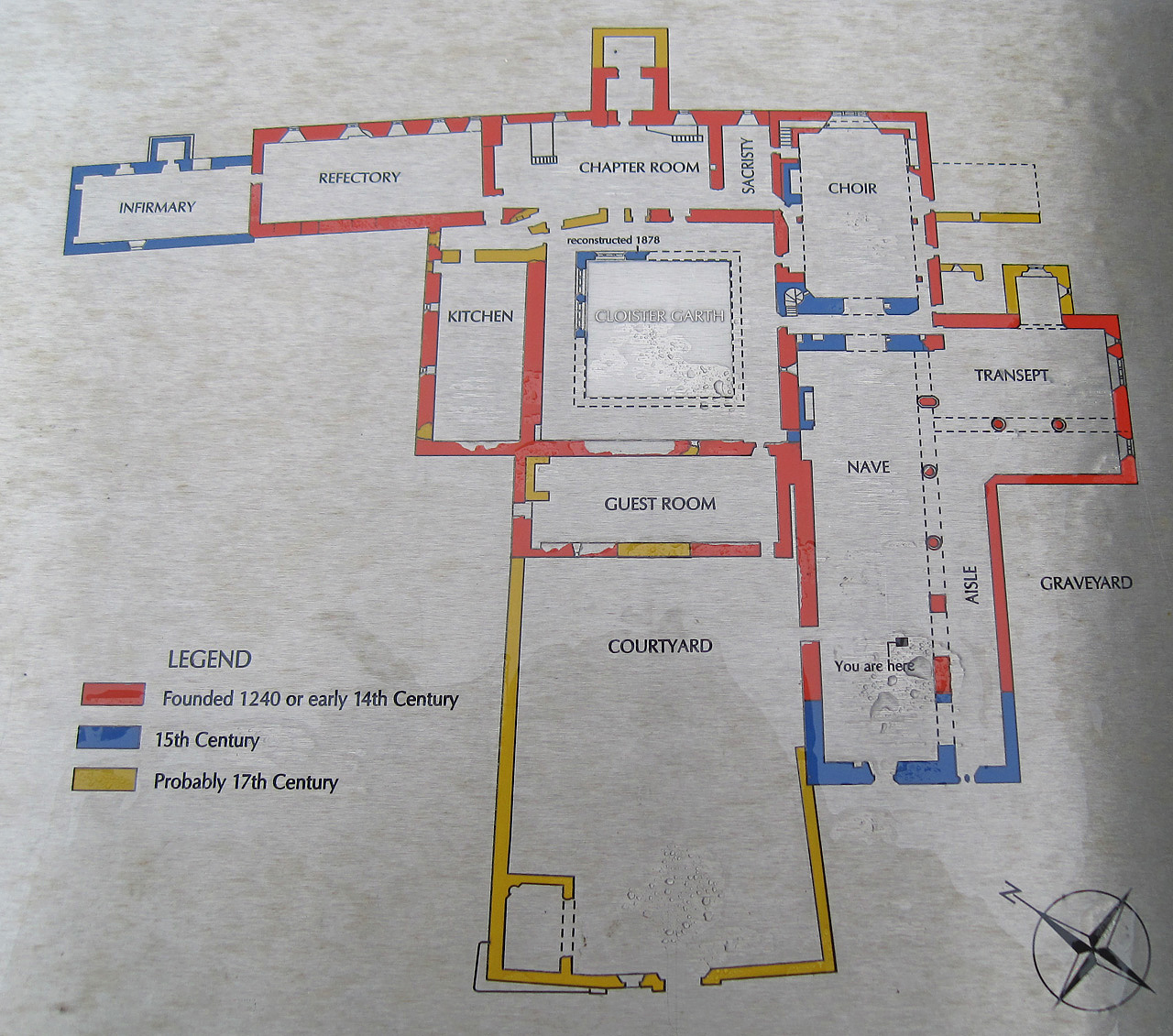
A floor-plan of the friary showing roughly when each section was built, from a plaque located in the nave of the ruins

The friary is the largest medieval ruin in West Cork. The use of locally available freestone was typical in the construction of Franciscan friaries of the period, and Timoleague Friary is no exception, having been made from locally sourced slate, quarried in nearby Borleigh. Built in the Early English Gothic architectural style, the architectural details are quite plain. Despite the extensive standing remains, the friary was once much larger than it is today. Records show that in the late 1500s the friary had a mill attached to the main structure, and that the monastery stood on a 4.5-acre site – four times larger than what is left of the friary grounds today. The floor of the friary is considerably higher today than it would have been when the structure was in use, a result of the burials that have occurred since the structure was ruined.

At the entrance to the nave, now used as the main entrance to the friary, a fleur-de-lis is engraved on the left jamb. The doorway features simple mouldings, features of the Perpendicular Gothic period. The original monks were likely French-speaking, and would have used the fleur-de-lis as an aid to describing the Holy Trinity. A small recess above the door was used to hold either a sculpture or other religious imagery. The nave was considerably smaller when the friary was first constructed; it features an arcade of six arches, only three of which are original.

A leprosarium was located in Spittal, a nearby townland, and as a result, the south window of the transept was known as the "Leper's Hole" or "Lepers' Window" — a gap through which sufferers of leprosy could see and hear the service, and partake in the Blessed Sacrament. The window is narrower on the outside than it is on the inside, and the Eucharist was likely passed out by the monks on a spoon so as to avoid contact with a disease which was considered highly contagious at the time.

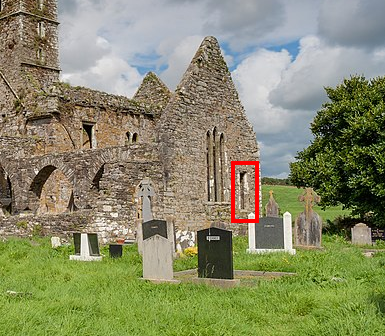
The southern transept of the friary, viewed from the south-east, with the so-called "Leper's hole" highlighted in red

The choir is the oldest part of the friary and may have originally been an early 13th-century castle or church that the Franciscans later added to. It is notably tall and features unusual components such as long arches and triforium wall passages. It features four widely splayed arched recesses in the north and south walls, separated by piers, one of which is now covered by the base of the tower. The recess nearest the east gable contained the sedilia. A niche on the northern wall once contained an altar in memory of the de Courcey family. The great window in the choir faces east, and once contained elaborate stained glass imagery. The graves of the McCarthy Reagh family are also located here.

The sacristy features a bullaun stone, commonly known as a “wart well” as the water in the depression was said to heal warts. This stone is far older than any other aspect of the friary, and may have originally been associated with the original 6th or 7th century monastic site.

One of the protruding stones on the exterior wall is known as "St Molaga's Head". A gift given by French sailors as thanksgiving for safe harbour following a storm at sea, it was originally a sculpture of Molaga's head, but the facial features have been completely eroded.

A room generally considered to have been the library is the only section of the friary not in use as a burial ground. This may have been the place of residence of the friars who remained in Timoleague after the destruction of the friary. The windows present in the remaining ground floor of this room would not have been sufficient for literary work, and the library was actually more likely to have been on the upper floor.

When Donatus Mooney visited the friary in the 17th century, he noted that the ceilings above the refectory and the chapter room were supported by beams of carved oak. The chapter room may have at one time been the location of the library, though it was later used for storage purposes. The chamber designated as the refectory is evidenced by traces of a reader's seat and one of the five windows which lighted it.

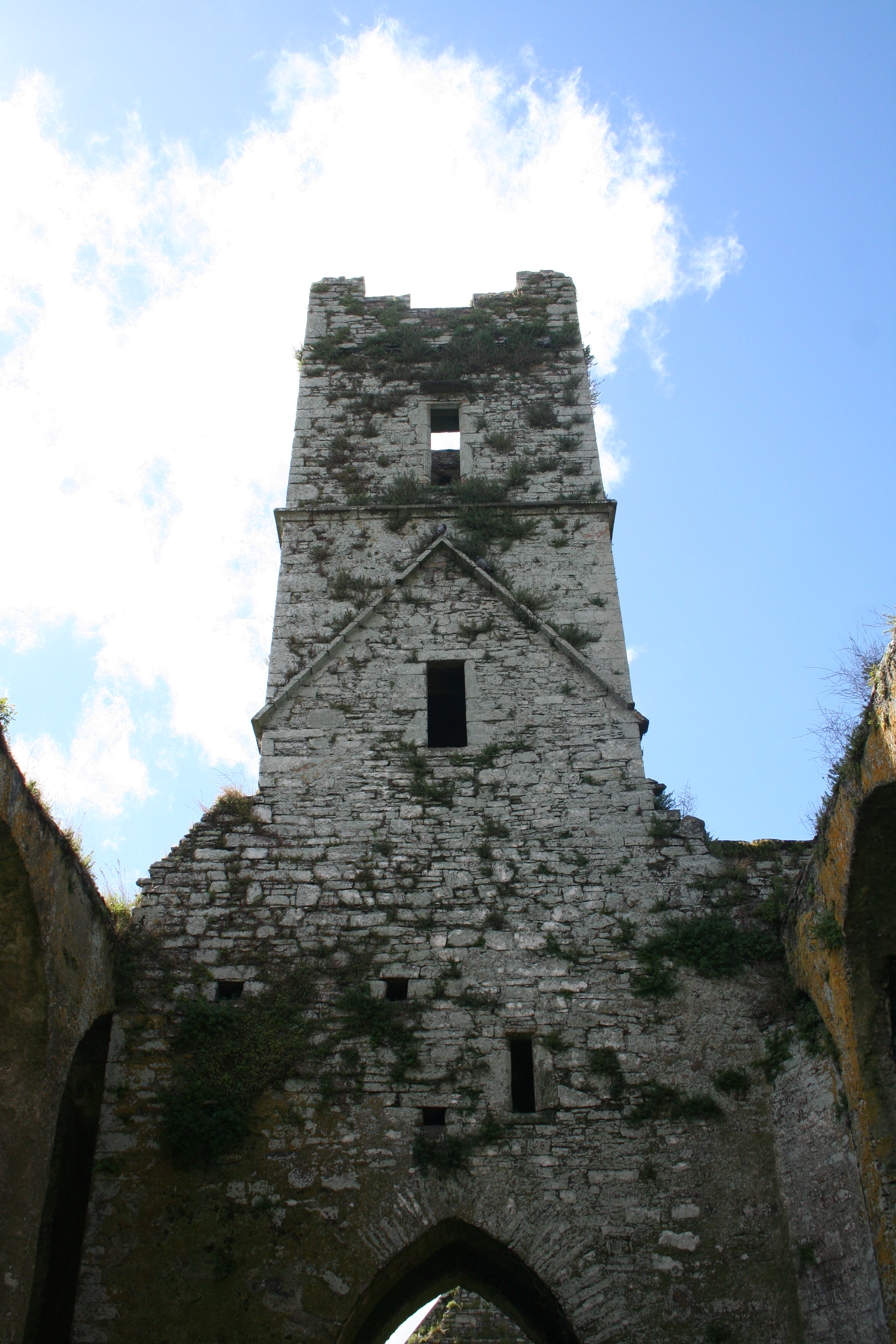
Bell tower

The friary originally had a cloister, but only a portion of its walls remain standing. It is unclear whether the ambulatory extended along the western side. The cloister and the monk's living quarters are towards the north of the church, which is typical of Irish Franciscan friaries. The cloister quadrangle would have covered an area 9.8 metres (32 ft) across by 9.3 metres (30.5 ft) wide. In the south wall of the cloister is an intramural space known locally as "The Fairy Cupboard". In the 1800s, some local children supposedly entered the Fairy Cupboard and discovered a parchment manuscript beneath one of the flagstones, which they used as a football before the remainder was eaten by pigs. Documentary evidence suggests that there was exterior access from the cloister to rooms on the upper floor, which would have been unusual. Though there are no traces of steps, there are indications that the space typically occupied by the chapter room in Franciscan friaries was used as a cellarage, and that the chapter room was located above. A further atypical feature of the friary is that alongside the cloister it has a large outdoor courtyard.

The bell tower is one of fourteen pre-reformation towers built in Franciscan monasteries that still stand today. It is a later addition to the friary, and was erected in the early 16th century. The tower is wider from north to south than from west to east, a feature typical of Franciscan towers. It measures 4.0 metres (13 ft) from west to east and 4.6 metres (15 ft) from north to south. Also typical is the abrupt narrowing of the cross-walls from the north and south at the point where the tower begins. The tower is more obviously battered than most Franciscan towers. The tower is battlemented, as are almost all surviving towers. The top of the tower has three merlons rising to each of its four corners.

== Historical artefacts ==
=== Book of Lismore ===
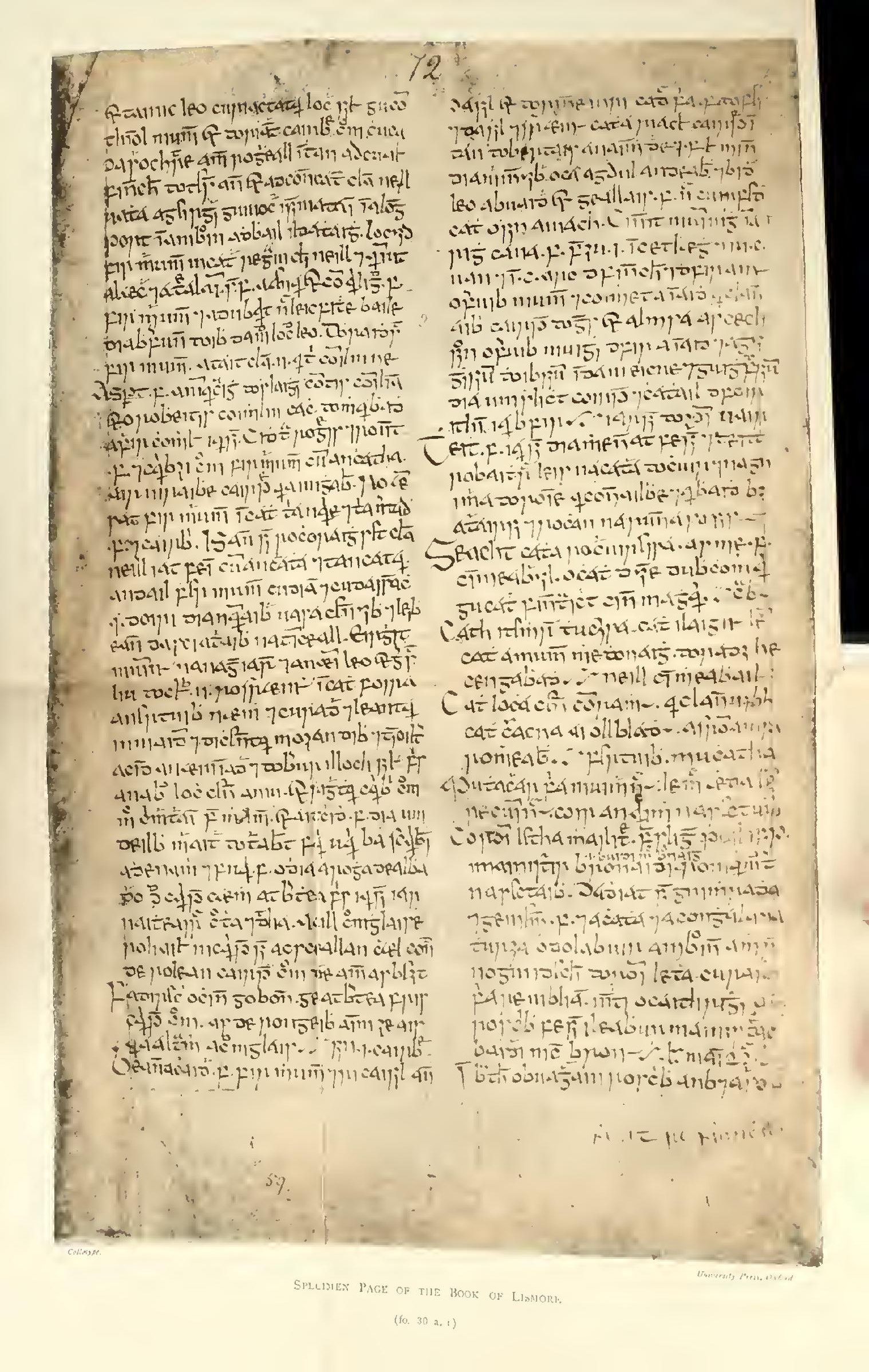
A hagiographical page from the Book of Lismore

Leabhar Leasa Móir, or the Book of Lismore, also known as Leabhar Mhic Cárthaigh Riabhaigh, is a 15th-century manuscript with connections to the friary. Though some sources claim that the manuscript was written or partly written in the friary, Professor Pádraig Ó Macháin, an expert on Irish manuscripts, says that that is not the case. It was held in the friary at times, and material from the book was transcribed there by Mícheál Ó Cléirigh in 1629.

=== Timoleague Chalices ===
Two 17th century chalices – both of which are referred to as the "Timoleague Chalice" – are associated with the friary. The first, also known as the "Dale-Browne Chalice", or the "Dale Chalice", is made of gilt silver and was created circa. 1600. After the suppression of the monastery, one of the friars supposedly escaped with the chalice, disguised himself and lived as a farmer. His dying wish was that the chalice and his vestments were buried in a box beneath his house and that they remain buried until the friary was restored and the friars had returned. Years later, the box was discovered while the house was undergoing renovations. The contents were given to Franciscans in Cork.

The earlier chalice is engraved with the words "Orate · Pro · Animabvs · Caroli · Dali · Et · Elizie · Browne · TimoLeagve." around the base, which translates as "Pray for the souls of Charles Daly and Elizabeth Browne, Timoleague". It is 8.5 inches tall, with the tulip-shaped bowl measuring 3.25 inches wide and 3 inches deep. Its primary decoration is on one facet of its tall hexagonal foot. It depicts a selection of the Instruments of the Passion: a central cross with a spear to one side and a stick with a sponge on the other. The cross is depicted as the tree of life, with branches sprouting from its tip and base and shamrocks forming its head and arms. The chalice was likely a gift from the Dalys (Elizabeth Browne being Charles' wife) to the friars upon their return to the friary after its suppression in 1568. It is currently held by the Collins Barracks branch of the National Museum of Ireland.

The later chalice, also known as the "Timoleague Franciscan Chalice", is made of gold and may date to c. 1633. When the friary was burned, three friars supposedly fled via rowboat and were found at sea by fishermen from Cape Clear Island, by which time two of them had died. A box was left with the fishermen by the surviving friar, with instructions that they not open it as he would one day return for it, though he never did. It was re-opened in 1860 and found to contain a set of severely deteriorated vestments and a chalice "black with age". The chalice is engraved with the words "ffr'MinConv de Thimolaggi" ("Friars Minor Convent of Timoleague"). In 1892, 250 years after the chalice was removed from the town, it was returned to the parish priest of Timoleague. It has remained in the safekeeping of his successors, and an exact replica of the chalice is on permanent display in the local Catholic church.

== In culture ==
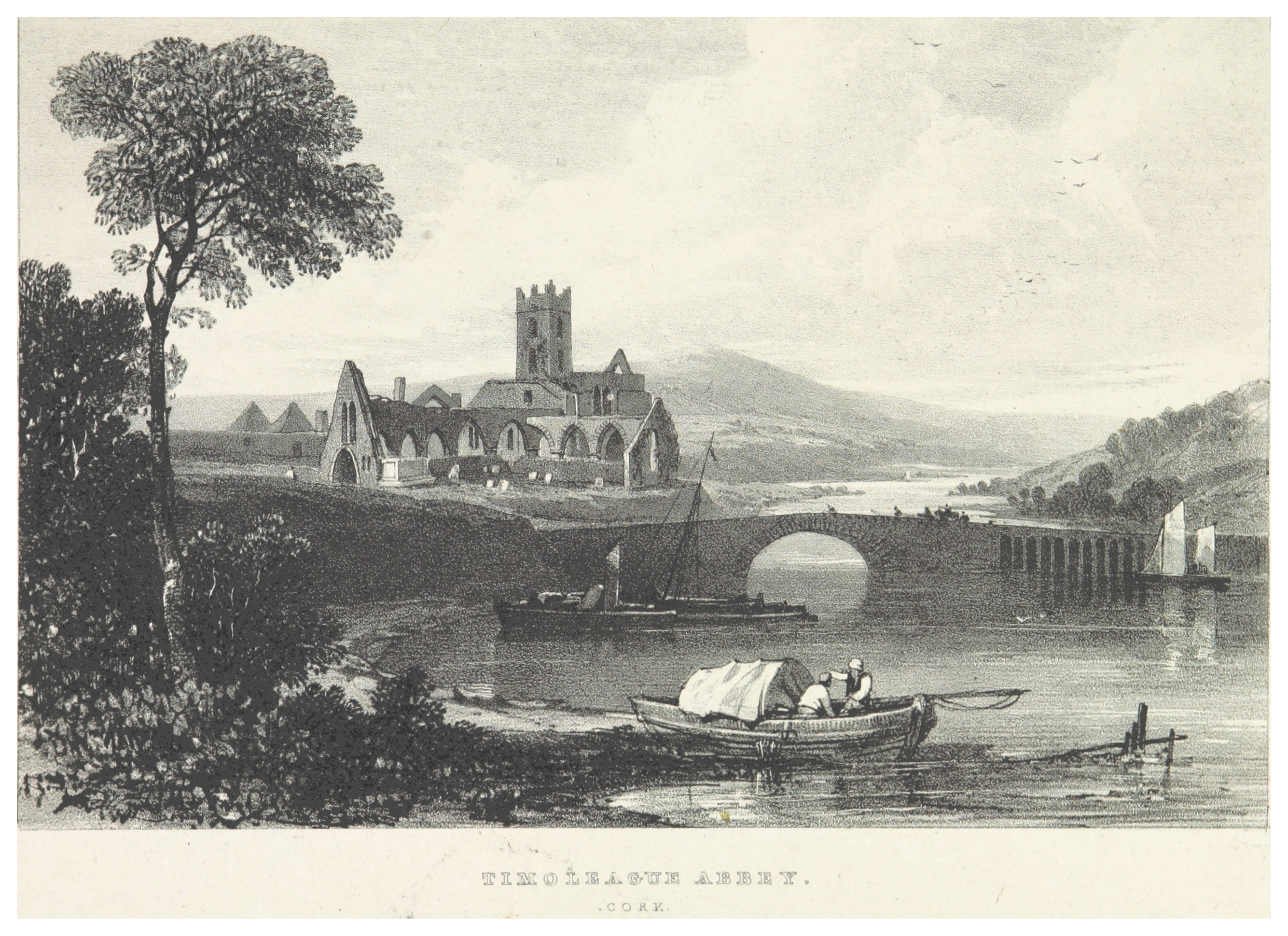
Sketch of the friary, Robert O'Callaghan-Newenham, c. 1820

William Ashford depicted the friary several times: first in a pencil sketch, and then again among his earliest landscape works, which include a rough drawing of the friary, titled Timoleague (abbey ruins), which he followed with two 1776 watercolours of the ruins. The Irish writer Seán Ó Coileáin wrote the c. 1812 poem Machtnadh an Duine Dhoilghiosaich about the ruins. James Hardiman described it as one of the "finest modern poems in the Irish language" in 1831. It has been translated to English several times, including as The Mourner's Soliloquy in the Ruined Abbey of Timoleague and as Lament over the Ruins of the Abbey of Teach Molaga by Sir Samuel Ferguson. A bronze cast of one of the verses in the original Irish is located at the entrance gate of the ruins.

== Gallery ==
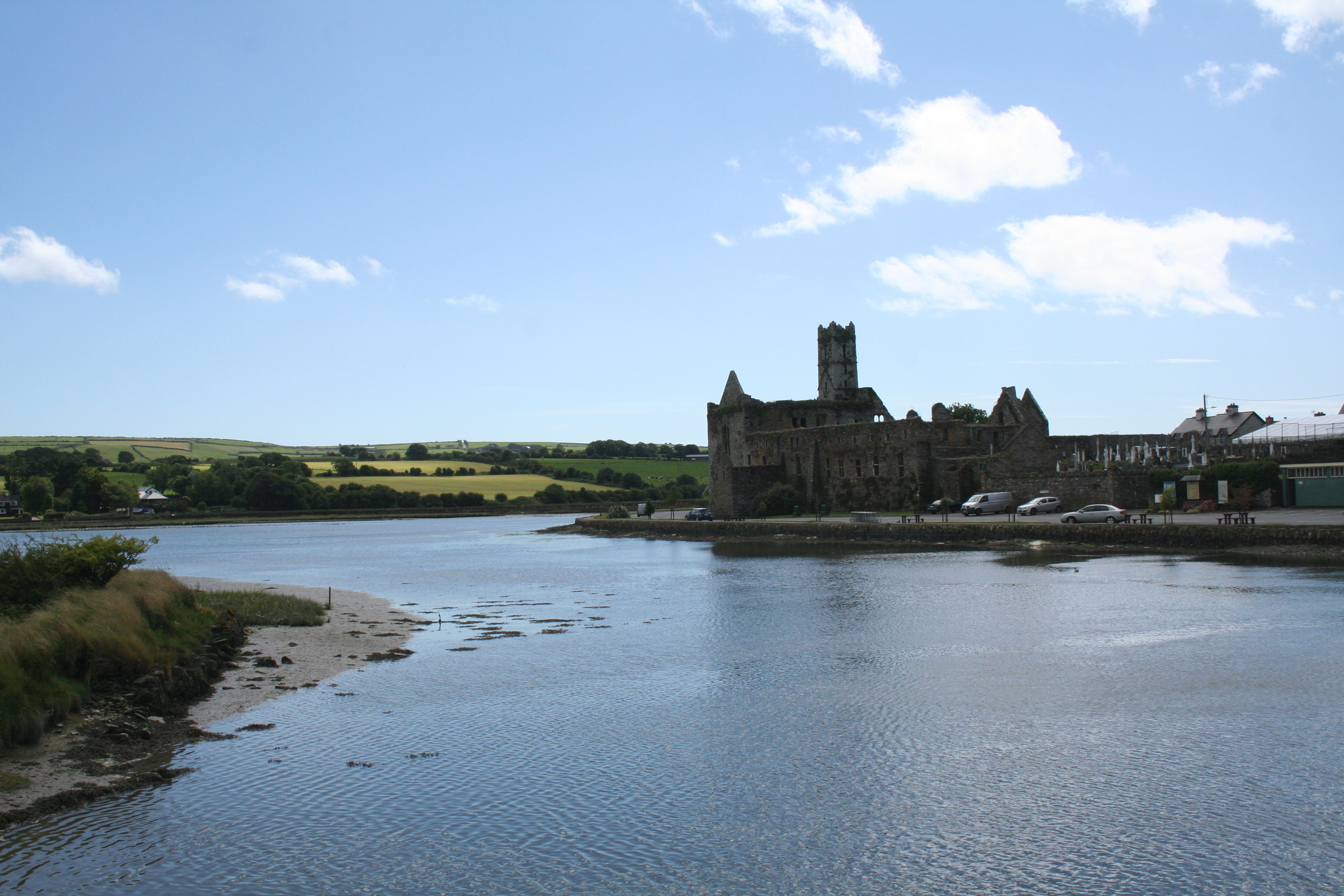
View of Timoleague Friary

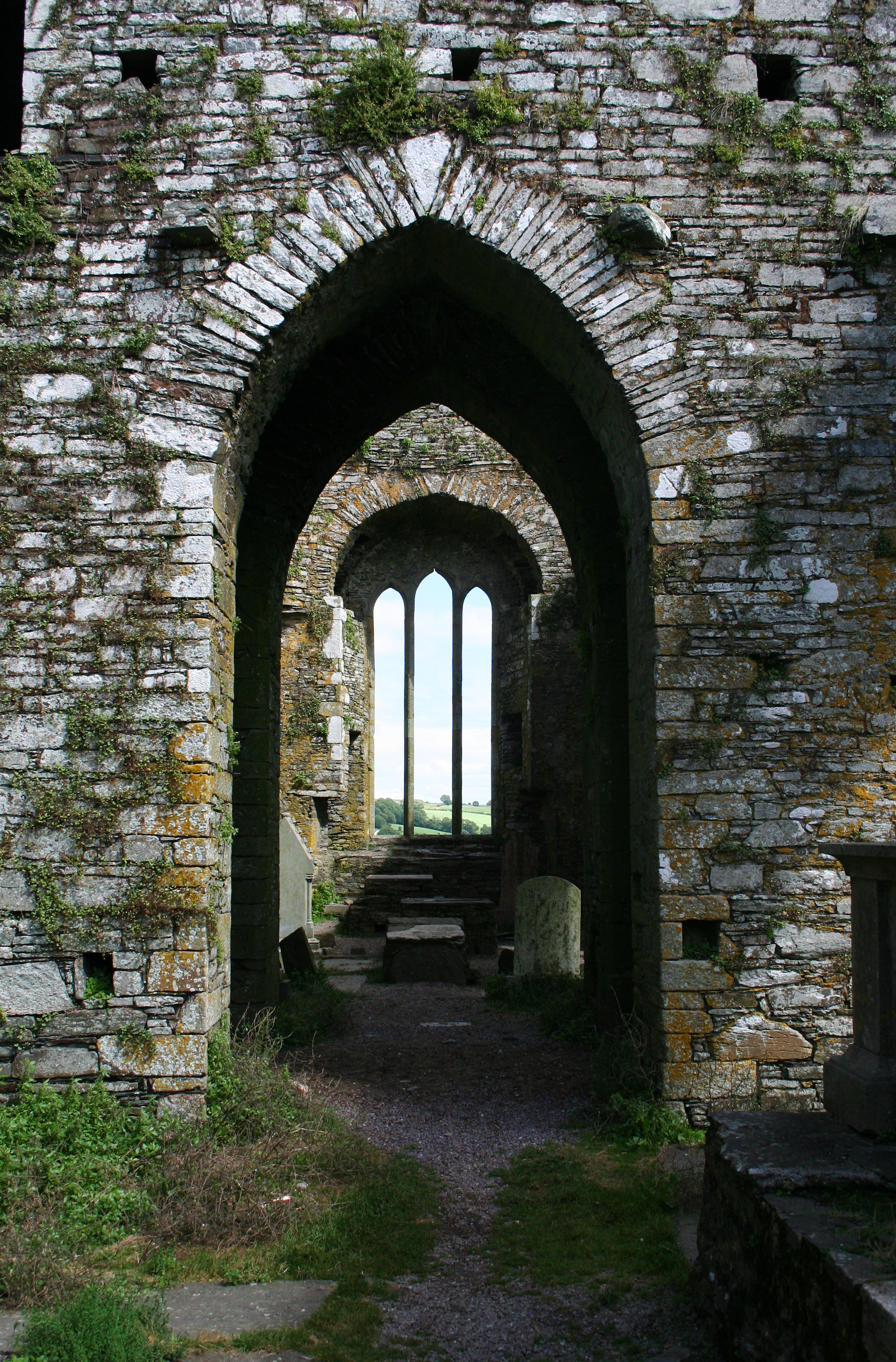
Interior of church
