= Church of the Ascension, Timoleague =

Anglican church in County Cork, Ireland

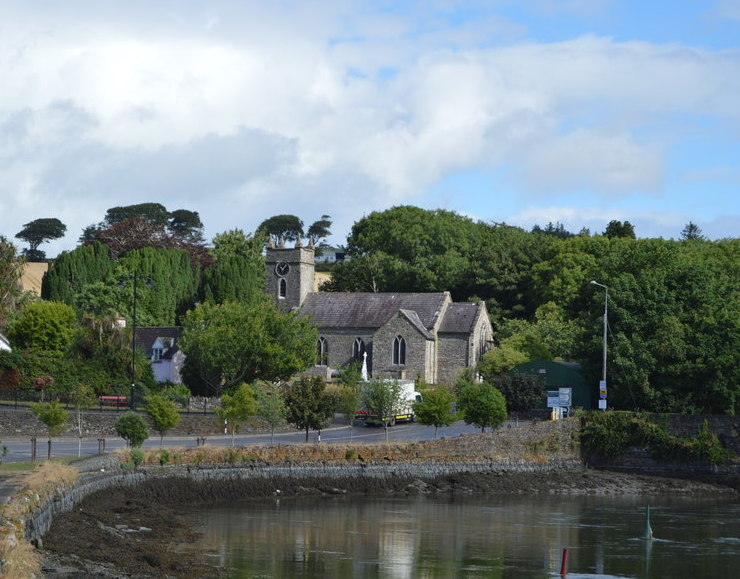
- Church of the Ascension, Timoleague, County Cork
- Church of the Ascension, Timoleague
- 51.6453°N 8.7643°W
- Location: Timoleague, County Cork
- Country: Ireland
- Denomination: Church of Ireland

History
- Consecrated: 1811

The Church of the Ascension is a small Gothic Revival church building belonging to the Church of Ireland in Timoleague, a town in West Cork, Ireland. It is dedicated to the Ascension of Jesus. Part of the Kilgarrife Union of Parishes in the Diocese of Cork, Cloyne and Ross, the church is noted for its intricate mosaics.

== History ==
The site hosting the Church of the Ascension was previously the site of an earlier medieval church. It was reportedly still in good condition as late as 1699, with an average congregation of 80. On 21 August 1802, the Bishop ordered the church to be torn down, as it had become unsafe due to age and decay. He further mandated that the materials of the church be kept for the construction of a new church.

The construction of the church was funded by a loan from the Board of First Fruits, and was constructed between 1810 and 1811. The church was consecrated on 25 May 1811. It followed the typical "church and tower" layout of an early Board of First Fruits church. Unlike later Board of First Fruits churches, it originally lacked both a chancel and vestry.

On 15 December 1832, Rev Charles Ferguson, the vicar of the church, was murdered in a field near Bandon. His killing has been attributed to discontent surrounding tithes. He was beaten to death with a rock, suffering "extensive fractures" to his skull, which left him "almost unrecognisable".

A vestry and a chancel were added to the church between 1861 and 1863, and designed by Welland & Gillespie. Bishop John Gregg refused to consecrate the new chancel, due to what he called a "graven" representation of the Crucifixion in the stained glass east window. The window remained hidden behind a curtain until the early 20th century.

The southern transept was added in 1890.

== Architecture ==
=== Exterior ===
The exterior of the church is typical of those funded by the Board of First Fruits. It has a simple, rectangular body, and is orientated east to west. Though the church is built in the Gothic Revival style, it is unusually unadorned. The church deviates from typical First Fruit churches in that the tower, to the west of the body of the church, features a clock which faces the town.

=== Interior ===
The church features an angel shaped font made of Carrera marble. The font is dedicated to Alice Maud Travers. The walls are of liver-coloured marble up to the room's dado, with many mosaics applied to the upper walls. Above the door of the church, there is painting portraying the Ascension of Jesus, in which the Apostles are present along with a panorama of Jerusalem.

==== Mosaics ====
The church is known for its interior mosaic decoration, which is in both European and Islamic style. Two sets of mosaics commemorate respectively the local landowning Travers family, and a local man, Lt.Col. Alymer Martin Crofts.

The first of the set of mosaics commissioned by Robert Augustus Travers was commissioned in 1894. They feature a star of David, a pelican, and a lamb on the chancel arch. Travers' wife, Laura Isabel, died in 1906 and Travers commissioned mosaics in her memory. These mosaics are Mughal in style, and feature various emblems such as lotuses, fleur-de-lys, and paschal lamps. Robert Augustus' son, Robert Valentine Travers, died aged 22 in 1915 during the Gallipoli campaign. Further mosaics on the side walls of the church depicting these events were commissioned by Robert Augustus in honour of his son.

The second set of mosaics, dedicated to Surgeon-General Alymer Martin Crofts, were added to the church between 1918 and 1925. Crofts was from Cork, and had links with the Timoleague area. He went to India in 1877, where he stayed until 1914. While there, he was a tutor, mentor, and friend to the Maharaja Madho Rao Scindia of Gwalior, India, who financed the mosaics in the church in Crofts' honour. The mosaics were likely designed by William Henry Hill.

In 2021, the mosaics of the Church of the Ascension were the county winners for Cork in the county awards of Ireland's National Heritage Week.
