= Molaga =

7th-century Irish saint

Saint Molaga
- Saint Molaga's Well, Aghacross, County Cork
- Born: c. 580; Fermoy, County Cork, Ireland
- Died: c. 664; Labbamolaga Church, County Cork, Ireland
- Venerated in: Roman Catholic Church
- Major shrine: Timoleague Friary
- Feast: Various (including 20 January)
- Patronage: Fermoy barony (Fir Maige Féine)

Saint Molaga (c. 580 – c. 664; also known as Molagga, Molaca, Molaige, Laicin, Lóch or Lóichín) was an Irish monk and saint, primarily associated with County Cork. He is also associated with beekeeping in Ireland, alongside Gobnait and the earlier saint, Modomnoc.

== Biography ==
Molaga was believed to have been born miraculously to parents of advanced years, as the son of Dub Dliged and Minchollait, an event said to have been foretold by Cumméne Fota. He was attached to the lands of the Fir Maige Féine (now the Fermoy barony of County Cork) and was born into the family of Luchta. He was baptised by Cumin of Mayo and studied the scriptures in his native area.

Molaga later travelled to Ulster and Scotland, after which he was brought to Saint David of Menevia in Wales. David is alleged to have given the saint his name alongside a bell named Boban Molaga. Molaga was warned by an angel to return to Ireland and crossed to Dublin (referred to as Dún Duibhlinne), where he established a monastery at Balbriggan and cured the local king using his bell. He was then granted a town in Fingal where he erected a church and established a swarm of bees. He later returned to southern Ireland and survived the Plague of 664. Tradition holds that he founded the churches at Timoleague Friary and Labbamolaga Church; according to the Book of Lismore, he is buried in the latter.

As first suggested by William Copeland Borlase, his veneration likely originated as one of several Christian survivals of the pre-Christian deity Lugh. In hagiographical tradition, he is represented as the special patron saint of the Fir Maige region. His narrative brings him into contact with other prominent 7th-century figures, including the Munster king Cathal Cú-cen-máthair.

A vernacular Life of the saint (Beata Molaga) in the Book of Fermoy was likely composed in the 14th century. The saint had various feast days, including 20 January in north Cork. Two days in August (Lug's month) are also recorded; 7 and 13.
