= Dunderrow =

Village in County Cork, Ireland

Dunderrow Dún Darú
- Village
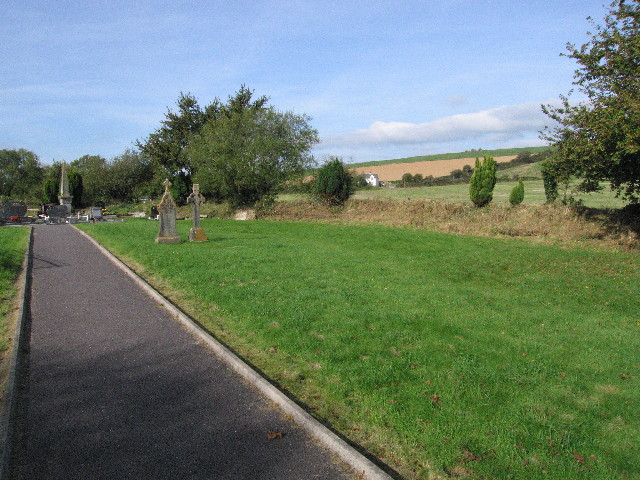
- Dunderrow cemetery

- Location in Ireland
- Coordinates: 51°43′40″N 08°35′37″W
- Country: Ireland
- Province: Munster
- County: County Cork

Population (2022)
  - Total: 213
- Time zone: UTC+0 (WET)
  - Summer (DST): UTC-1 (IST (WEST))
- Irish Grid Reference: W590529

Dunderrow (Irish: Dún Darú, meaning 'oak fort') is a small village in County Cork, Ireland. It is 5 km north-west of Kinsale, on the R605 road between Kinsale and Innishannon. Dún Darú, anglicised as Dunderrow, means the fort of the oak-plain, with the site of the fort (dún) for which it is named located to the south of the village. The village is in a townland and civil parish of the same name.

Dunderrow National School, in the centre of the village, was built in 2000 to replace an earlier 19th-century building. To the east of the village is Dunderrow cemetery, formerly the site of a 19th-century Church of Ireland church (no longer standing).

An Eli Lilly facility is situated near Dunderrow on approximately 50 hectares (120 acres) of land. It commenced operations in 1981.

== See also ==
- List of towns and villages in Ireland
