= R607 road (Ireland) =

Regional road in Ireland

R607 road
- Bóthar R607

Route information
- Length: 12.5 km (7.8 mi)

Major junctions
- From: N71 at Ballyheedy, County Cork
- To: R605 at Abbey Lands, Kinsale

Location
- Country: Ireland

Highway system
- Roads in Ireland; Motorways; Primary; Secondary; Regional
← R606	→ R608

The R607 road is a regional road in County Cork, Ireland. It travels from the N71 road to Kinsale. The road is 12.5 kilometres (7.8 mi) long.
