= R602 road (Ireland) =

Road in Ireland

Coordinates: 51.720512°N 8.766155°W

R602 road
- Bóthar R602

Route information
- Length: 9.9 km (6.2 mi)

Major junctions
- From: N71 Old Chapel (west of Bandon)
- To: R600 Timoleague

Location
- Country: Ireland

Highway system
- Roads in Ireland; Motorways; Primary; Secondary; Regional

The R602 road is a regional road in Ireland, located in County Cork.
