= Madho Rao Scindia =

Maharaja of Gwalior from 1886 to 1925

Sir Madho Rao Scindia I GCSI GCVO GBE
- 6th Maharaja Scindia of Gwalior
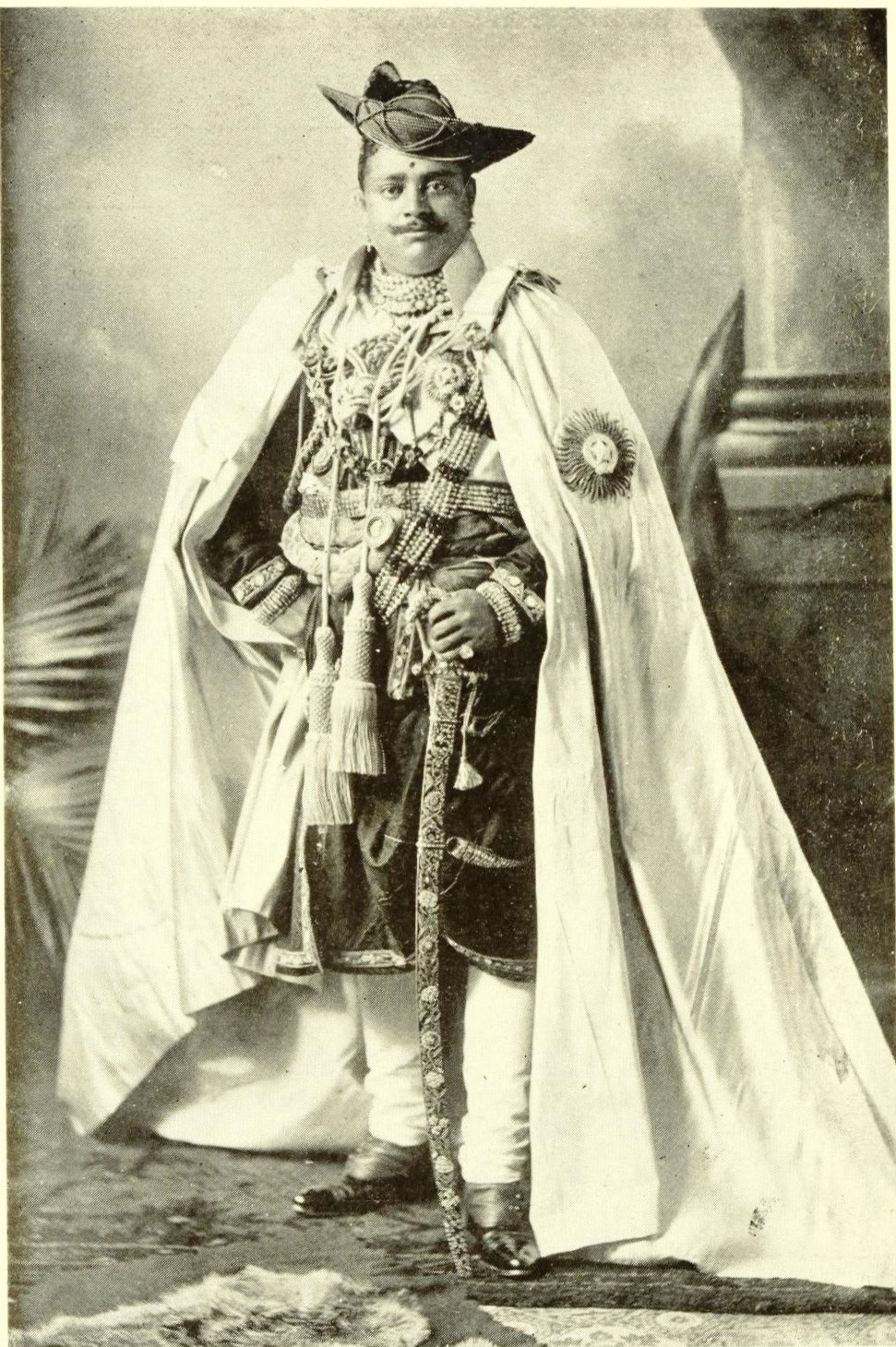
- Formal portrait, 1911, Delhi Durbar

6th Maharaja of Gwalior
- Reign: 20 June 1886 – 5 June 1925
- Predecessor: Jayajirao Scindia
- Successor: Jiwajirao Scindia
- Born: 20 October 1876; Jai Vilas Palace, Laskhar, Gwalior
- Died: 5 June 1925 (aged 48); Paris, France
- Burial: Père Lachaise Cemetery (Buried)
- Spouse: Maharani Gajara Raje Rane
- Issue: Jivaji Rao Scindia
- House: Scindia Dynasty
- Father: Jayajirao Scindia
- Mother: Sakhyabai Raje Sahib Scindia Bahadur

Maharaja Sir Madhorao Scindia I of Gwalior (20 October 1876 – 5 June 1925), was the 6th Maharaja of Gwalior belonging to the Scindia dynasty of the Marathas. He was one of the most visionary and progressive rulers of the Scindia Dynasty and an influential investor who invested his wealth in different companies more prominently TISCO (Tata Iron and Stell Company) that helped Tatas grow rapidly in their business expansion. He invested in multiple shares and hold dividends in many Indian companies which made him the only ruler having investments as shares and bonds in multiple companies during his era.

== Biography ==
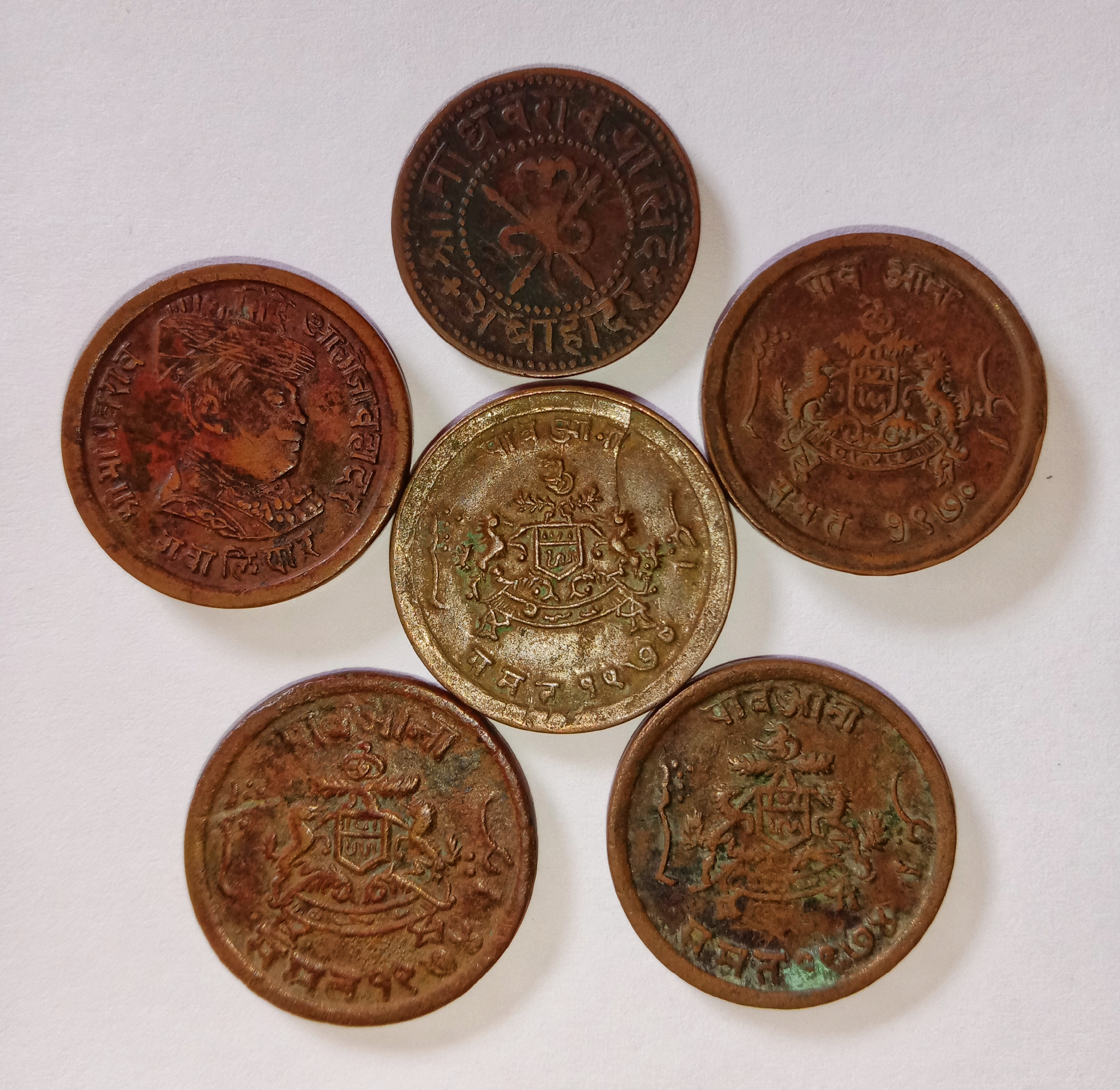
Copper coins, minted in Gwalior, issued on the name of Madho Rao Scindia

Madho Rao acceded to the throne in 1886 and ruled until his death in 1925. He was noted by the British Government as a progressive ruler of a princely state. He was married twice, but only had children with his second wife in 1913, one son and one daughter, to whom King George V and Queen Mary stood sponsors. He was succeeded by his son, Maharajdhiraja Maharaja Sir George Jivaji Rao Scindia, 7th Maharaja Scindia of Gwalior. His daughter married, but died without children in 1934.

The Maharaja of Gwalior is also known as the rejected suitor of Gayatri Devi's mother, the glamorous Princess Indira of Baroda (Indira Devi), who broke off her engagement (contracted between her parents and her fiancé) by letter. The Maharaja then married Gajararaje from the Rane family of Goa. Later on, Gajararaje's sisters were married into the notable Sardar families of Gwalior, which included the Angre, Shitole & the Mahadik Families.

The Maharaja received a number of honours and decorations from the United Kingdom and other Indian States. He was appointed Honorary Aide-de-camp to King Edward VII in 1901, in recognition of his support during the Boxer Rebellion in China. In May of the following year, he received the honorary degree LL.D. from the University of Cambridge. He was invested as Knight Grand Cross of the Royal Victorian Order (GCVO) on 2 February 1903, during a visit to British India, including Gwalior, by the Duke and Duchess of Connaught.

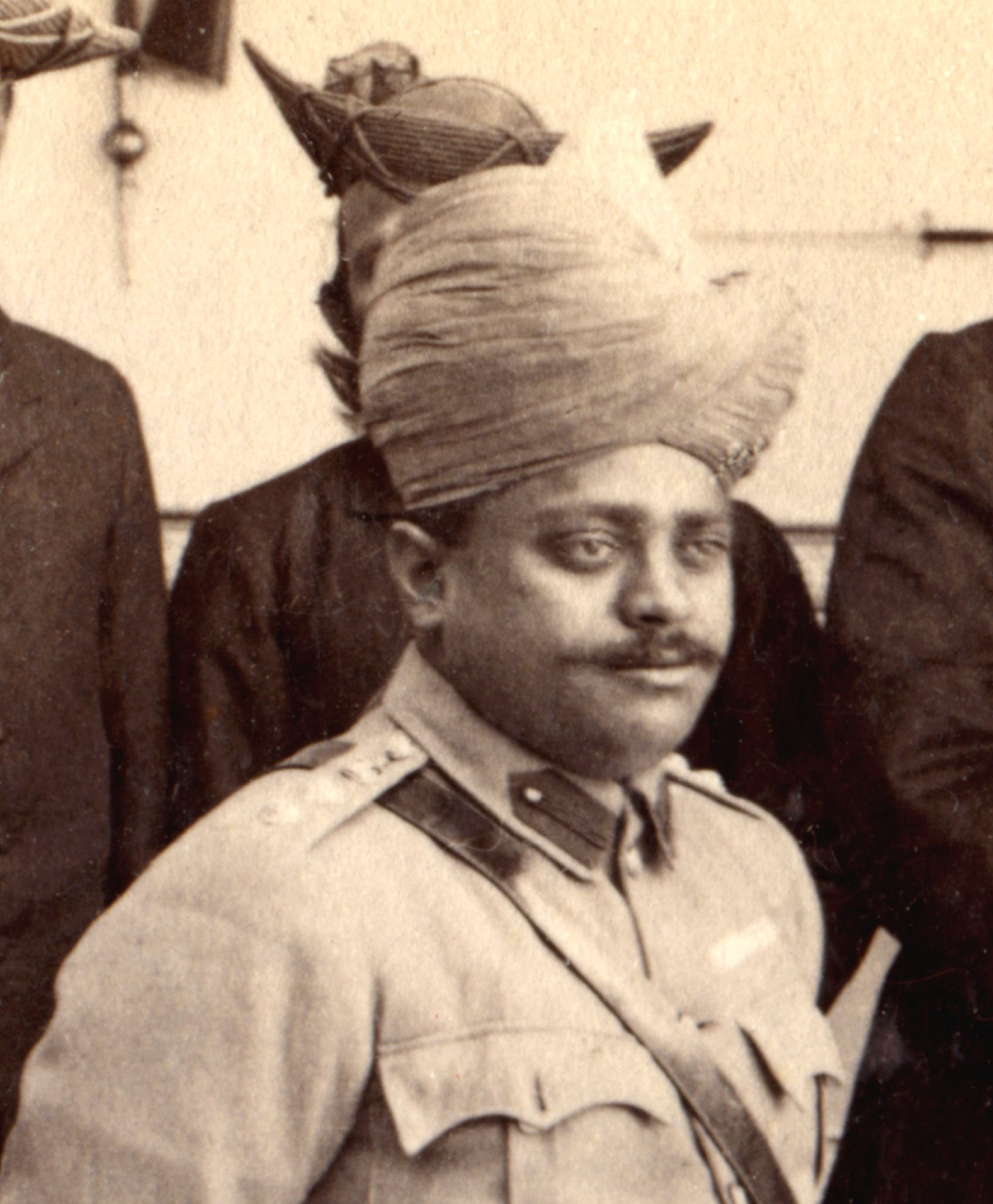
Madho Rao Scindia, c. 1903

An interesting story is that Madho Rao, the Maharajah of Gwalior, helped to fund the completion of a set of mosaics in the Church of the Ascension in Timoleague, County Cork, Ireland. The mosaics are of particular note, begun in 1894 by Mr. Robert Augustus Travers of Timoleague House in memory of family members, continued in 1918 by his son Robert in commemoration of his father and brother who were killed at Gallipoli. The last phase of the mosaics was at the expense of the Maharajah of Gwalior, installed as a memorial to his friend and physician, Lt. Col Crofts IMS from Councamore (near Timoleague), who had saved the life of his son. The mosaic was completed by Italian workmen in 1925, ten years after the doctor's death. The mosaic, most likely designed by the Church of Ireland architect W.H. Hill, is a blend of the European and the Islamic. The series of stained glass windows include a Warrington over the altar (east window), glass by Lavers, Westlake and also Mayer elsewhere. The architect Jeremy Williams wrote in "A Companion Guide to Architecture in Ireland 1837-1921" that "this building was a monument to a living friendship enshrined in a hidden masterpiece of the Arts and Crafts Movement in Ireland" and that it "transcended the sectarian divide between Irish Catholic and Protestant, the Indian Muslim and Hindu, personal friendship breaking up distinctions of caste and colour."

== Titles ==
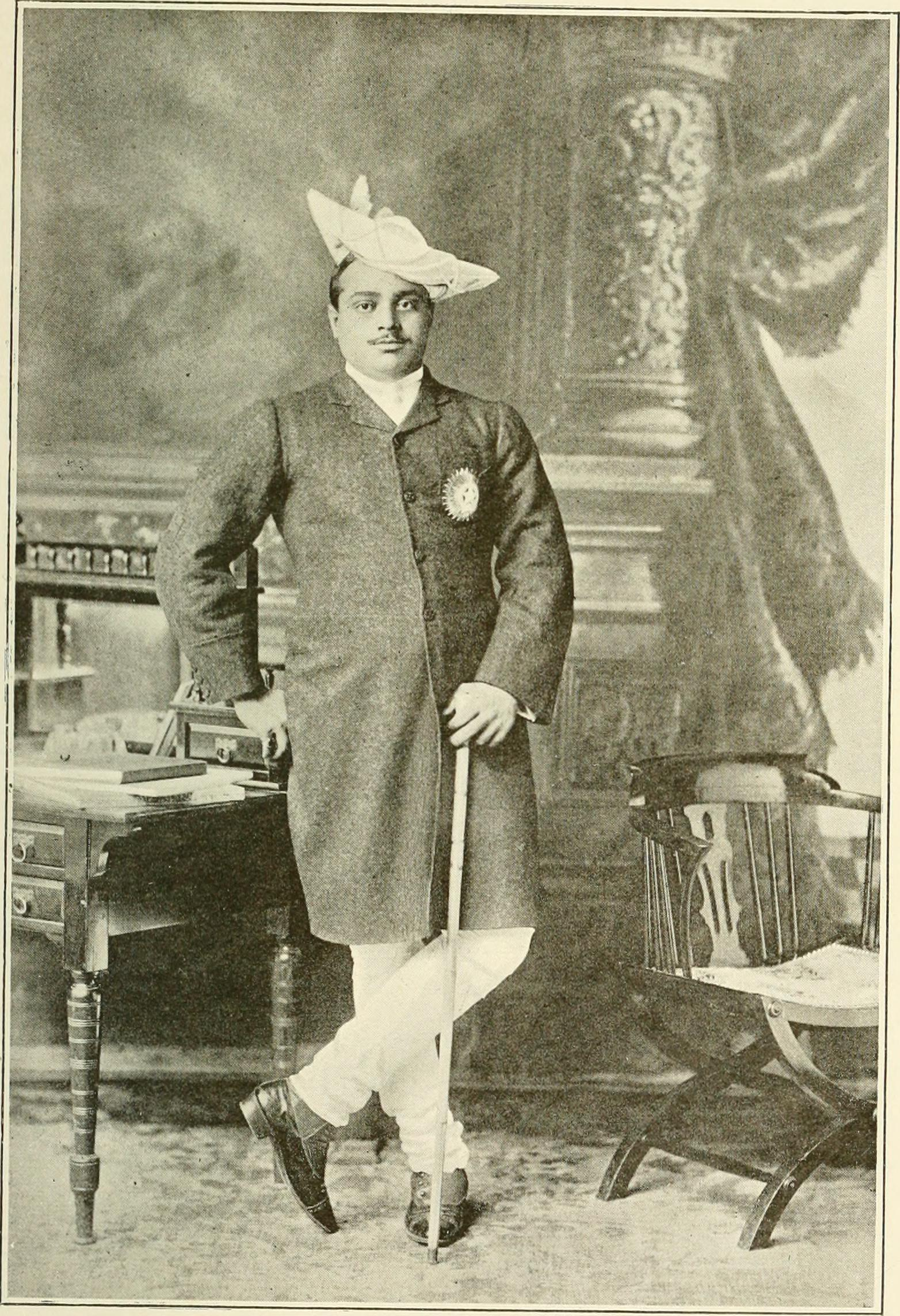
Maharaja of Gwalior in 1907

- 1876-1886: Yuvaraja Maharaj Shrimant Madho Rao Scindia Bahadur
- 1886-1895: His Highness Ali Jah, Umdat ul-Umara, Hisam us-Sultanat, Mukhtar ul-Mulk, Azim ul-Iqtidar, Rafi-us-Shan, Wala Shikoh, Muhtasham-i-Dauran, Maharajadhiraj Maharaja Shrimant Madho Rao Scindia Bahadur, Shrinath, Mansur-i-Zaman, Fidvi-i-Hazrat-i-Malika-i-Mua'zzama-i-Rafi-ud-Darja-i-Inglistan, Maharaja Scindia of Gwalior
- 1895-1898: His Highness Ali Jah, Umdat ul-Umara, Hisam us-Sultanat, Mukhtar ul-Mulk, Azim ul-Iqtidar, Rafi-us-Shan, Wala Shikoh, Muhtasham-i-Dauran, Maharajadhiraj Maharaja Shrimant Sir Madho Rao Scindia Bahadur, Shrinath, Mansur-i-Zaman, Fidvi-i-Hazrat-i-Malika-i-Mua'zzama-i-Rafi-ud-Darja-i-Inglistan, Maharaja Scindia of Gwalior, GCSI
- 1898-1900: Colonel His Highness Ali Jah, Umdat ul-Umara, Hisam us-Sultanat, Mukhtar ul-Mulk, Azim ul-Iqtidar, Rafi-us-Shan, Wala Shikoh, Muhtasham-i-Dauran, Maharajadhiraj Maharaja Shrimant Sir Madho Rao Scindia Bahadur, Shrinath, Mansur-i-Zaman, Fidvi-i-Hazrat-i-Malika-i-Mua'zzama-i-Rafi-ud-Darja-i-Inglistan, Maharaja Scindia of Gwalior, GCSI
- 1900-1903: Colonel His Highness Ali Jah, Umdat ul-Umara, Hisam us-Sultanat, Mukhtar ul-Mulk, Azim ul-Iqtidar, Rafi-us-Shan, Wala Shikoh, Muhtasham-i-Dauran, Maharajadhiraj Maharaja Shrimant Sir Madho Rao Scindia Bahadur, Shrinath, Mansur-i-Zaman, Fidvi-i-Hazrat-i-Malika-i-Mua'zzama-i-Rafi-ud-Darja-i-Inglistan, Maharaja Scindia of Gwalior, GCSI
- 1903-1910: Colonel His Highness Ali Jah, Umdat ul-Umara, Hisam us-Sultanat, Mukhtar ul-Mulk, Azim ul-Iqtidar, Rafi-us-Shan, Wala Shikoh, Muhtasham-i-Dauran, Maharajadhiraj Maharaja Shrimant Sir Madho Rao Scindia Bahadur, Shrinath, Mansur-i-Zaman, Fidvi-i-Hazrat-i-Malika-i-Mua'zzama-i-Rafi-ud-Darja-i-Inglistan, Maharaja Scindia of Gwalior, GCSI, GCVO
- 1910-1917: Major-General His Highness Ali Jah, Umdat ul-Umara, Hisam us-Sultanat, Mukhtar ul-Mulk, Azim ul-Iqtidar, Rafi-us-Shan, Wala Shikoh, Muhtasham-i-Dauran, Maharajadhiraj Maharaja Shrimant Sir Madho Rao Scindia Bahadur, Shrinath, Mansur-i-Zaman, Fidvi-i-Hazrat-i-Malika-i-Mua'zzama-i-Rafi-ud-Darja-i-Inglistan, Maharaja Scindia of Gwalior, GCSI, GCVO
- 1917-1918: Major-General His Highness Ali Jah, Umdat ul-Umara, Hisam us-Sultanat, Mukhtar ul-Mulk, Azim ul-Iqtidar, Rafi-us-Shan, Wala Shikoh, Muhtasham-i-Dauran, Maharajadhiraj Maharaja Shrimant Sir Madho Rao Scindia Bahadur, Shrinath, Mansur-i-Zaman, Fidvi-i-Hazrat-i-Malika-i-Mua'zzama-i-Rafi-ud-Darja-i-Inglistan, Maharaja Scindia of Gwalior, GCSI, GCVO, GBE
- 1918-1925: Lieutenant-General His Highness Ali Jah, Umdat ul-Umara, Hisam us-Sultanat, Mukhtar ul-Mulk, Azim ul-Iqtidar, Rafi-us-Shan, Wala Shikoh, Muhtasham-i-Dauran, Maharajadhiraj Maharaja Shrimant Sir Madho Rao Scindia Bahadur, Shrinath, Mansur-i-Zaman, Fidvi-i-Hazrat-i-Malika-i-Mua'zzama-i-Rafi-ud-Darja-i-Inglistan, Maharaja Scindia of Gwalior, GCSI, GCVO, GBE

== Honours ==
(ribbon bar, as it would look today; incomplete)

- Knight Grand Commander of the Order of the Star of India (GCSI)-1895
- Kaisar-i-Hind Medal, 1st Class-1900
- China War Medal (1900)-1901
- Knight Grand Cross of the Royal Victorian Order (GCVO) – 2 February 1903
- King Edward VII Coronation Medal-1902
- Knight Grand Cross of the Order of Philip the Magnanimous of Hesse -1903
- Delhi Durbar Gold Medal -1903
- King George V Coronation Medal -1911
- Bailiff Grand Cross of the Venerable Order of Saint John (GCStJ)-1911
- Delhi Durbar Gold Medal -1911
- Knight Grand Cross of the Order of the British Empire (GBE)-1917

Madho Rao Scindia Scindia Dynasty Born: 20 October 1876 Died: 5 June 1925
Regnal titles
Preceded by Jayajirao Scindia	Maharaja of Gwalior; 1886–1925	Succeeded by George Jivaji Rao Scindia
