= Timoleague =

Village in County Cork, Ireland

Timoleague Tigh Molaige
- Village
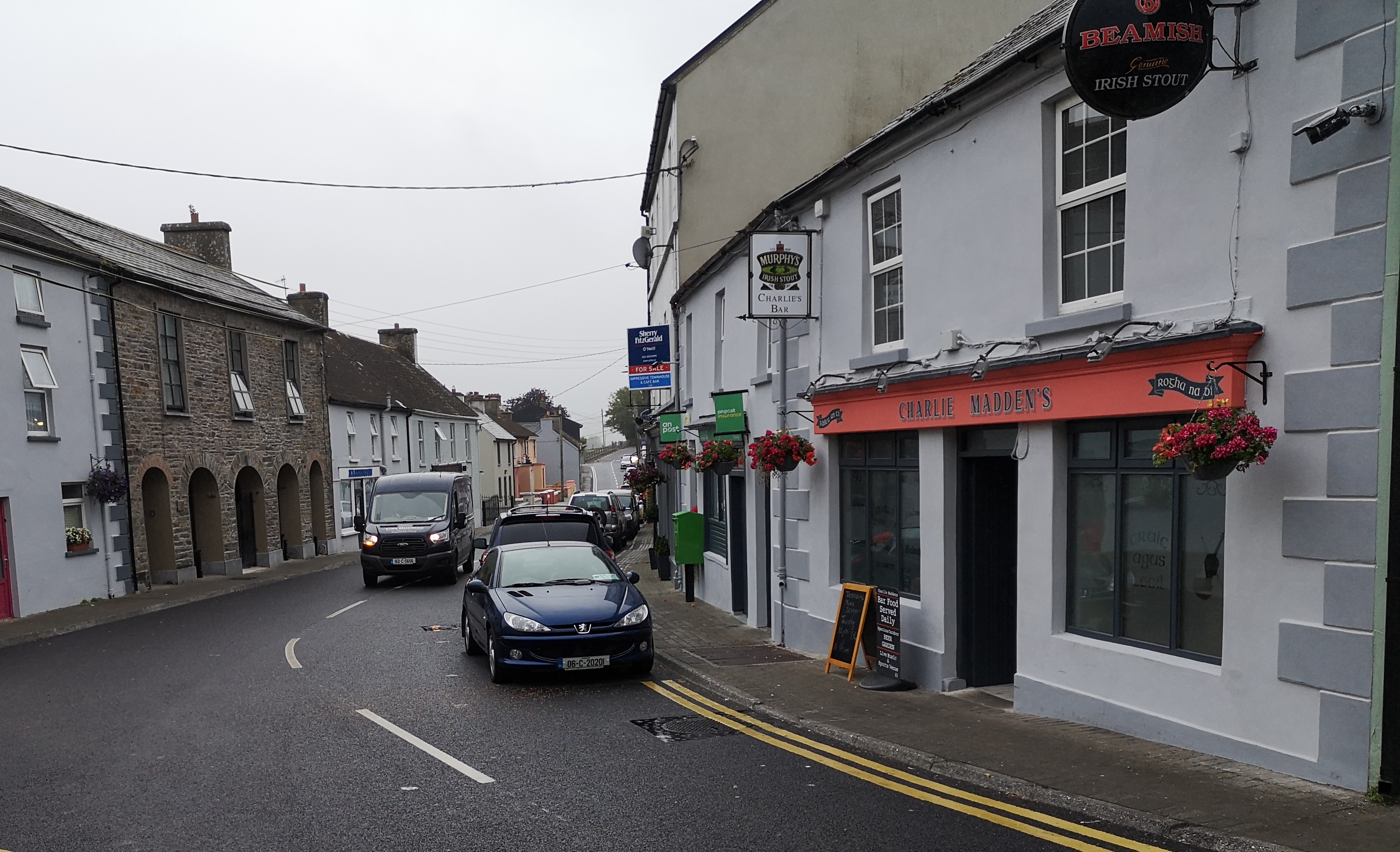
- The R600 road passes through Timoleague

- Location in Ireland
- Coordinates: 51°38′33″N 8°46′1″W
- Country: Ireland
- Province: Munster
- County: Cork
- Barony: Carbery East (East)
- District: Clonakilty
- Established: 1240 A.D
- Elevation: 28 m (92 ft)

Population (2022)
  - Total: 387
- Time zone: UTC+0 (WET)
  - Summer (DST): UTC-1 (IST (WEST))
- Irish grid reference: W469437

Timoleague (Irish: Tigh Molaige, meaning 'house of Molaga') is a village in the eastern division of Carbery East in County Cork, Ireland. It is located along Ireland's southern coast between Kinsale and Clonakilty, on the estuary of the Argideen River. Nearby is the village of Courtmacsherry. It is about 17 km (11 mi) south of Bandon and 48 km (30 mi) from Cork on the R600 coastal road. The village is in a townland and civil parish of the same name.

== History ==
Timoleague gets its name from its original Irish name Tigh Molaga, meaning the 'home (or house) of Molaga'. Saint Molaga was reputed to have brought beekeeping/honey to Ireland. Honey production is still evident in the area. The village was formerly spelt Tagumlag, Tymulagy, Tymoleague. The town of Timoleague and much of the adjacent country belonged to the Hodnetts, an English family who settled in the area from Shropshire. Prior to this, it belonged to the O'Cowigs. In the reign of Henry III, a great battle was fought at Timoleague, between the Hodnetts, under Lord Phillip Hodnett, and the Barrys, under Lord Barrymore. The Hodnetts were routed, and their leader was killed. The Barrymores then became the owners of Timoleague, and they and their descendants retained possession until the 1800s, when it was purchased by the Travers family.

In 1832, the Timoleague parish priest, Reverend Mr. Charles Ferguson, was murdered when trying to collect tithes by force.

== Places of interest ==
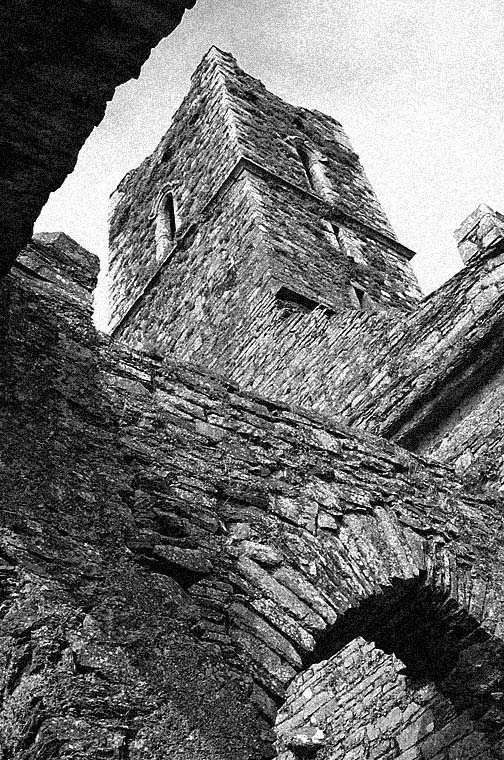
The ruins of Timoleague Friary

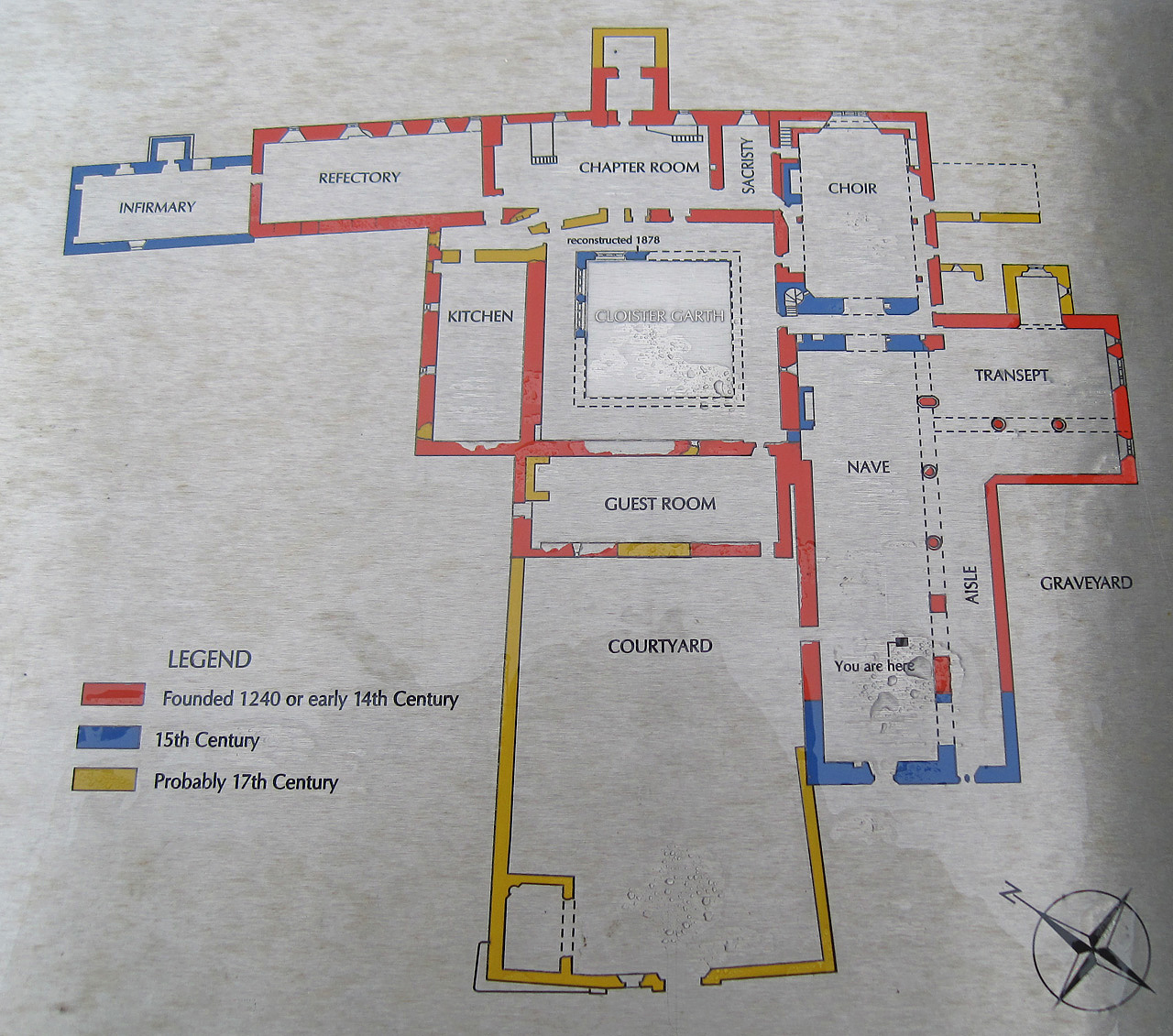
Floor plan and dates for Timoleague Friary

Timoleague Friary was founded by the Franciscan order in 1240. The abbey was built on the site of a monastic settlement founded by Saint Molaga in the sixth century. The Four Masters state that the Monastery of Timoleague was founded by MacCarthy Reagh, who lived near Kinsale, in 1240. The McCarthys were over-lords of Corca Laidhe, at least since the 13th century, and received tribute from the chiefs of the district. The abbey was extended by Donal Glas McCarthy in 1312, and by Irish and Norman patrons in the 16th century. The monks were dispersed by the Reformation, but returned in 1604. In 1612, the abbey was sacked by English soldiers who also smashed all of the stained glass windows, but much of the significant architecture remains. The friars remained in the abbey until 1642 when the friary and town were burnt by English soldiers under Lord Forbes.

In Abbeymahon, on the road to Courtmacsherry is the ruins of a Cistercian Abbey – Abbeymahon Abbey. The abbey was founded in 1172 by Dermot MacCormac MacCarthy, King of Desmond. The site was originally at Aghamanister and was colonized with a group of monks from Baltinglass. Almost a century lapsed before the monks decided to move to a new site. The monks moved to Abbeymahon in 1278 when Diarmuit MacCarthaig, son of Domnall Cairbreach, was buried in the new monastery.

The Church of Ireland church, the Church of the Ascension, is also decorated internally in mosaic work carried out and paid for by the Travers family and the final wall completed by the then Maharajah of Gwalior (Madho Rao Scindia) of India in 1925 in memory of his doctor, Dr Crofts, who came from Timoleague. The church itself dates from 1811.

== Economy ==
Some of the local industries are based around tourism, agriculture and craft. One of the main employers in the local area is Stauntons Food a local producer of Pork/Bacon products. There are many other small and medium-sized businesses in the area including a small local maker of bespoke kitchens/furniture.

Timoleague Brown Pudding, a type of blood sausage, has been granted Protected Geographical Status under European Union law.

== Demographics ==
As of the 2011 census, Timoleague had a population of 373. At the time, the village reportedly had the highest proportion of Polish people of any settlement in Ireland at 25% of the population. By the 2022 census, Timoleague had a population of 387, with 67% of people born in Ireland, 12% from Poland, 7% from the United Kingdom, and approximately 14% born elsewhere.

== Events ==
The Timoleague Harvest Festival is held every year in August. In 2006, it attracted acts like Mundy and The Walls, and involved a number of events in the village.

== Sport ==
The local GAA club, Argideen Rangers, have won the 2005 Cork Intermediate Hurling Championship as well as a number of Junior Football and Hurling County Championships.

== Transport ==
Timoleague railway station once connected the village to the West Cork Railway, by a branch onto the Clonakilty railway line, opened by the Ballinascarthy & Timoleague Junction Light Railway in 1890. The Timoleague & Courtmacsherry Extension Light Railway later extended this to Courtmacsherry in 1891 and its pier in 1892. It had three locomotives, Slaney, St. Molaga and Argadeen. Regular passenger traffic ceased in 1947 with post-war fuel shortages, and the line was closed completely by CIÉ in 1961. Timoleague railway station opened on 20 December 1890, closed for passenger traffic on 24 February 1947 and finally closed altogether on 1 April 1961.

== Notable people ==
- John Fihelly (1882–1945), Treasurer of Queensland
- Mark Foley, member of Cork senior hurling team, winner of 1990 All-Ireland Senior Hurling Championship
- Barry Harte, hurler who captained Carbery team, winner of 1994 Cork Senior Hurling Championship
- John Robert Leslie, academic
- Fachtna Murphy (b.1947), Garda Commissioner from 2007 to 2010
- Máire Ní Shíthe (1867–1955), Irish language writer from Clonakilty who lived for a period near Timoleague
- Tim Severin (1940–2020), British explorer and writer who lived locally until his death in December 2020

== See also ==
- List of towns and villages in Ireland
- Market Houses in Ireland
- List of Harvest Festivals
