= Book of Lismore =

15th century Irish manuscript

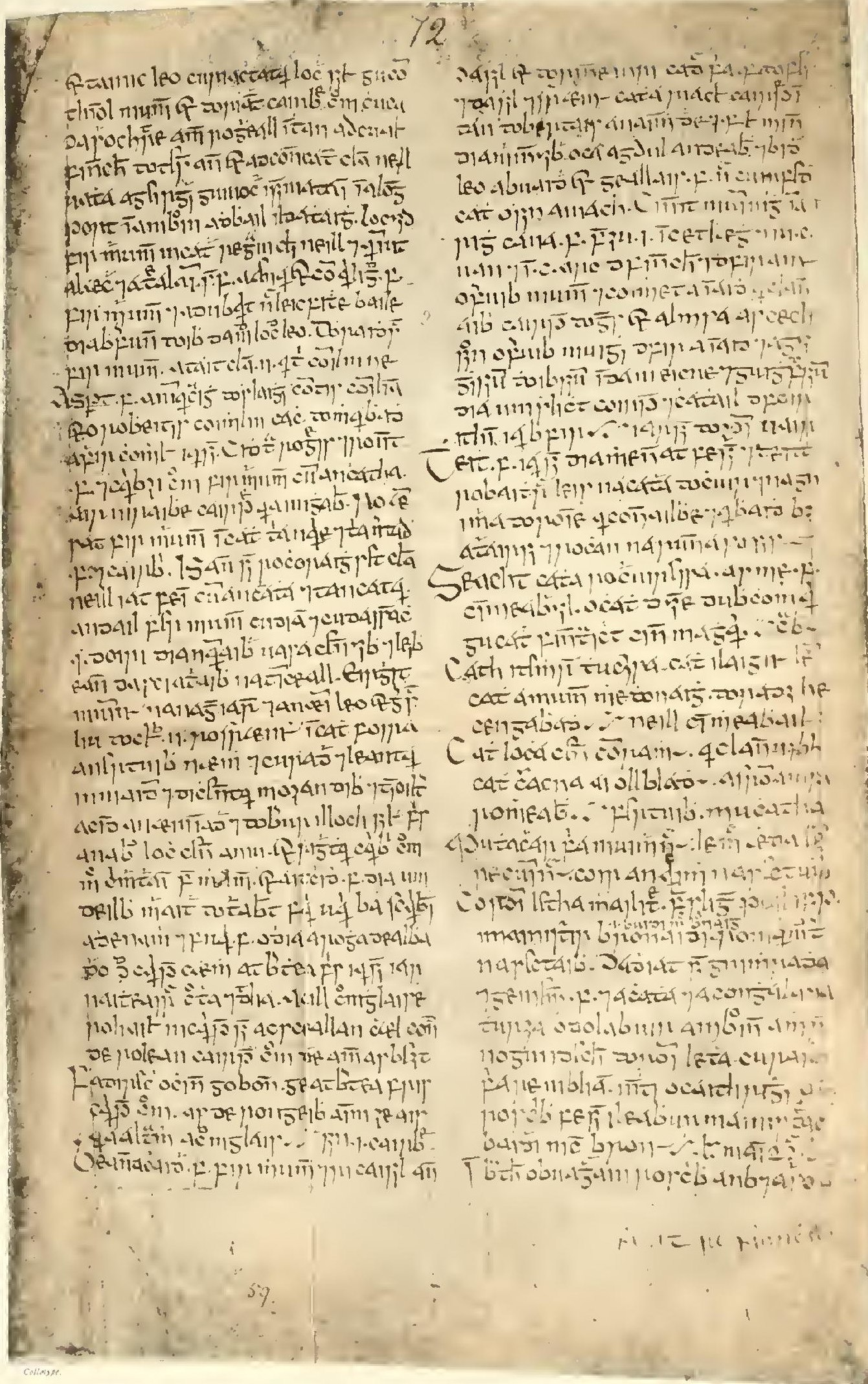
- Specimen page from the Book of Lismore, fo. 30 a. 1
- Also known as: The Book of Mac Carthaigh Riabhach
- Date: c. 1480
- Place of origin: Kilbrittain, County Cork, Ireland
- Language: Early Modern Irish
- Patron: Fínghean Mac Carthaigh Riabhach
- Material: Vellum
- Size: 37cm x 25cm
- Condition: Incomplete (missing at least 46 folios)
- Script: Irish minuscule

The Book of Lismore, also known as the Book of Mac Carthaigh Riabhach, is a late fifteenth-century Gaelic manuscript that was created at Kilbrittain in County Cork, Ireland, for Fínghean Mac Carthaigh, Lord of Carbery (1478–1505). Defective at beginning and end, 198 leaves survive today, containing a miscellany of religious and secular texts written entirely in Irish.

The main scribe of the manuscript did not sign his name. A second scribe, who wrote eleven leaves, signed himself Aonghus Ó Callanáin, and was probably a member of a well-known family of medical scholars from West Cork. Other relief scribes contribute short stints throughout the book.

The book also contains a reference (f. 158v) to a second manuscript, a duanaire or anthology of poetry dedicated to Mac Carthaigh, but this manuscript is now lost.

== Contents ==
While poetry is well represented throughout the manuscript, the dominant form is prose, dating linguistically from the high through late Middle Ages.

The contents display thoughtful organisation, beginning with religious material mostly relating to the saints of Ireland (lives and anecdotes), including Patrick, Brigid, Colum Cille, Ciarán and Brendan, but also incorporating the early medieval Teanga Bhiothnua ('Evernew tongue'). Texts translated to Irish, broadly related to the religious theme, are found in this section also, and feature the Conquests of Charlemagne, the History of the Lombards (a chapter from the Golden Legend), and The Travels of Marco Polo. It is probable that access by the Kilbrittain scribes to some of the religiously themed literature was facilitated by the Franciscan community at nearby Timoleague. Between them, the religious works and the translated texts account for approximately half of the contents.

The rest of the manuscript features native, secular texts. These include material relating to kingship, some of which centres on Diarmaid mac Cearbhaill, a sixth-century king of Ireland; tales such as Caithréim Cheallacháin Chaisil, Eachtra Thaidhg Mhic Céin and Cath Crionna; the satire Tromdhámh Ghuaire; and traditions concerning Fionn mac Cumhaill as related in the late-twelfth century prosimetrum, Agallamh na Seanórach. These Fionn traditions occupy approximately one quarter of the manuscript.

The book also contains Crichad an Chaoilli, a topographical document, possibly from the 13th Century, describing the district between Mallow and Fermoy in terms of townlands, the names of many of which are still recognizable in the form of their present-day counterparts.

The texts in the Book of Lismore are comprehensive in their representation of religious and secular learning in the Irish language as preserved and promoted by the elite learned classes of late-medieval Ireland. In its design and execution, and in its combination of native and European tradition, the book is a library of literature that makes a self-assured statement about aristocratic literary taste in autonomous Gaelic Ireland in the late 15th century.

== Later history ==
After the fifteenth century, one gets only sporadic glimpses of the book during the next 300 years. In June 1629 it was deposited in the nearby Franciscan Timoleague Friary, where the renowned scribe, author and historian, Brother Mícheál Ó Cléirigh copied material from it. It is thought to be identical to a book confiscated by Lewis, 1st Viscount Boyle of Kinalmeaky, then aged 23, at the siege of Kilbrittain Castle in 1642 during the Irish Confederate Wars, and sent by him to his father, The 1st Earl of Cork. Lord Boyle of Kinalmeaky (whose younger brother was the chemist Robert Boyle) died not long after, at the Battle of Liscarroll in September 1642.

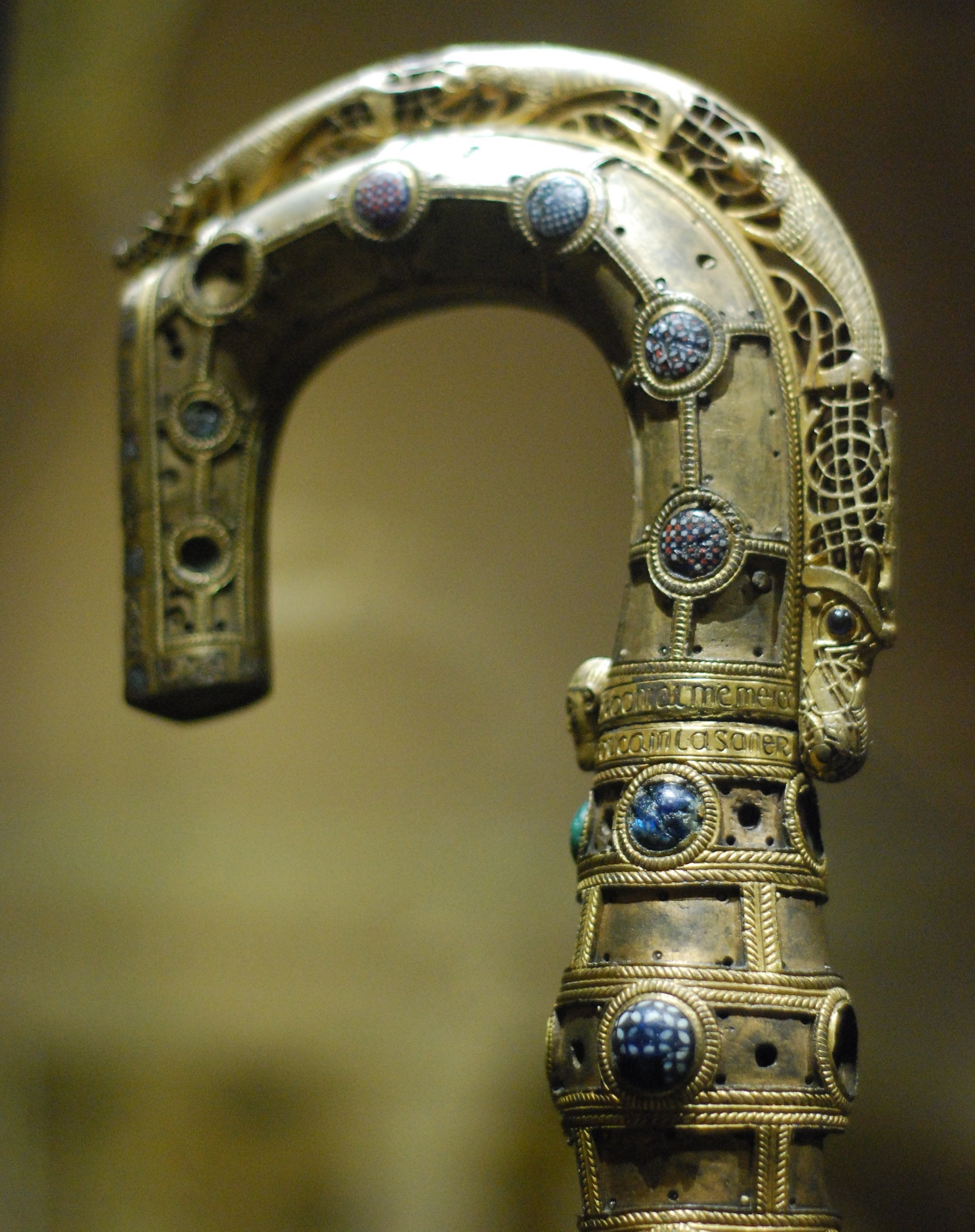
The Lismore Crozier, c. 1100, National Museum of Ireland, Dublin

It is uncertain when the book was brought to Lismore Castle in the west of County Waterford, a castle which Lord Cork had purchased from Sir Walter Raleigh in 1602. In the eighteenth century, the castle passed by marriage from the Boyle family to the Cavendishes, Dukes of Devonshire. In 1814, during renovations to the castle and town of Lismore by The 6th Duke of Devonshire, the manuscript was rediscovered, having apparently been walled up in the Castle with the Lismore Crozier, which is now in the National Museum of Ireland.

Upon its discovery, the book was soon loaned to the Cork scribe and scholar Donnchadh Ó Floinn (who named the book 'Leabhar Leasa Móire', the Book of Lismore), whose friend, Micheál Óg Ó Longáin, transcribed nearly all of the manuscript in 1817, under the sponsorship of Bishop John Murphy. The title 'Book of Lismore' or 'Leabhar Leasa Móir' dates from this time. From this and other transcripts by Mícheál Óg, many further copies of sections and individual texts were made, and this contributed to a temporary revival of manuscript-making in Cork during the first half of the nineteenth century.

The book was returned to Lismore around 1821–2, but sixty-six leaves remained in Cork, and were subsequently sold to the Duke of Devonshire in 1860. Further transcripts were made by Eugene O'Curry and by Mícheál Og's youngest son, Seosamh, who was by that time employed by the Royal Irish Academy. In 1907, the book went on public display at the Irish International Exhibition held in Herbert Park, Dublin. In 1930, the manuscript was transferred permanently from Lismore to Chatsworth House in England, where it remained until 2020, except for the years 1939–48 when it was removed to safe storage during the Second World War and also made available for the creation of the facsimile published in 1950.

In 1879, a photographic reproduction of pages from the manuscript appeared, for the first time, in the third fascicle of John Gilbert's Facsimiles of national manuscripts of Ireland. A printed photographic facsimile, in black and white, of the entire manuscript was made under the direction of R.A.S. Macalister and published in 1950. In 2010, the entire manuscript was digitised by Irish Script on Screen in advance of the public exhibition of the book at University College, Cork (UCC), in 2011.

In 2020, the Book of Lismore was donated to University College, Cork, by the Chatsworth Settlement Trust. The university plans to display it in their Boole Library.
