= Máire Ní Shíthe =

Irish-language writer

- Born: Mary Sheehy; 1868; Ballymacown, Killnagross, Clonakilty, County Cork
- Died: 13 July 1955 (aged 86–87); Clonakilty, County Cork

Máire Ní Shíthe (1868–13 July 1955) was an Irish language writer and translator from West Cork.

== Biography ==
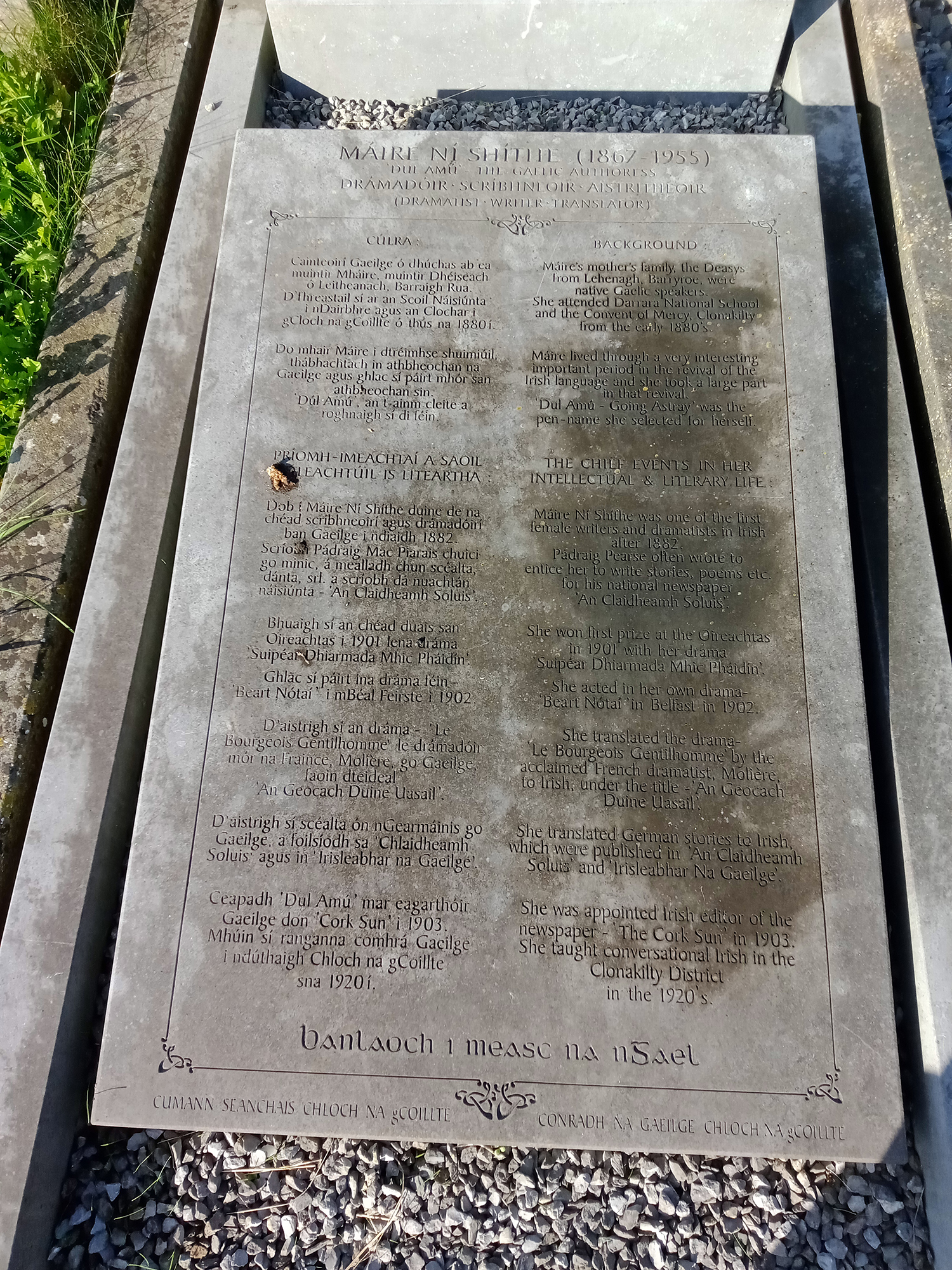
Ní Shíthe's grave in Timoleague

Máire (Minnie) Ní Shíthe was born to Timothy Sheehy and Ann Deasy in Ballymacown, Killnagross, near Clonakilty, County Cork about 1868. She was educated in Darrara National School and the Convent of Mercy, Clonakilty until about 1887. Ní Shíthe wrote for An Claidheamh Soluis where she was published using the pseudonym Dul Amu, first used on 2 December 1899 in Fáinne an Lae. She also was published in Irisleabhar na Gaeile. She had a talent for languages and translated dramas from French and German. She was a student of Donnchadh Pléimeann. She won the Oireachtais prize in 1901 with Suipéar Dhiarmada Mhic Phaidín. Ní Shíthe wrote with Eilís Ní Mhurchadha and in 1902 performed in their play Beart Nótaí in Belfast. Ní Shíthe worked as a translator for An Gúm as well as being the Irish language editor for the Cork Sun in 1903. Her translation in 1930, An Geocach Duine Uasail, of Molière's Le Bourgeois Gentilhomme was performed at the Gate Theatre, where it was directed by Micheál Mac Liammóir, as well as in Damer Hall in 1958.

Ní Shíthe married Denis Leary in 1915 and they became farmers. She died on 13 July 1955. She is buried in Timoleague Friary. A commemorative stone was erected on her grave in 2016.
