= Argideen River =

Minor river in West Cork, Ireland

Coordinates: 51°38′42.4″N 8°45′47.9″W

Location
- Country: Ireland

Physical characteristics
- Source
  - location: Reenascreena, County Cork
- Mouth
  - location: Celtic Sea at Courtmacsherry
- Length: 23 km (14 mi)

The Argideen River is a minor river in West Cork, Ireland. Its source is at Reenascreena and it flows for 23 km (14 mi) to the estuary at Timoleague, joining the Celtic Sea at the village of Courtmacsherry.

The Argideen drains peat bogs north-west of Clonakilty. There is an abundance of naturally reproducing salmon and sea trout. There are two private stretches of the river and the Argideen Anglers own 5 km (3 mi) of the river.
