= R600 road (Ireland) =

Regional road in Ireland

R600 road
- Bóthar R600
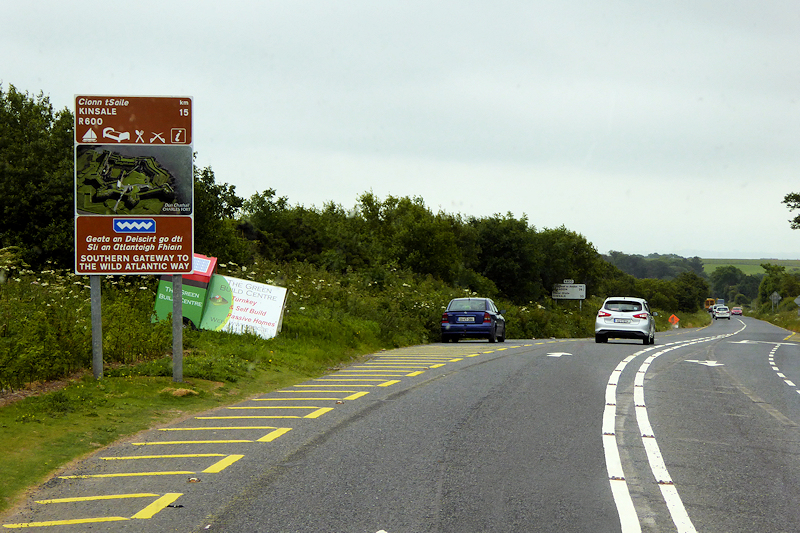
- From east to west, the R600 runs from Cork Airport, through Kinsale, via Timoleague to Clonakilty

Route information
- Length: 52 km (32 mi)

Location
- Country: Ireland
- Primary destinations: County Cork; Clonakilty; Timoleague; Crosses Argideen River; Harbour View; Ballinspittle; Crosses River Bandon; Kinsale; Crosses River Stick; Belgooly; Riverstick; Fivemilebridge; Ends at N27 Airport Road Roundabout

Highway system
- Roads in Ireland; Motorways; Primary; Secondary; Regional

The R600 road is a regional road in County Cork in Ireland. From west to east, it starts in the north of Clonakilty, going through Timoleague, Ballinspittle, Kinsale, Belgooly, and ending at Cork Airport, where the road continues as the N27 to Cork city centre and the N40 South Ring Road.

Sections of the R600 are way-marked as part the Wild Atlantic Way tourist route.

== See also ==
- Roads in Ireland
