= 4th Seanad =

Members of the Seanad from 1943 to 1944

| ← | 3rd Seanad | 5th Seanad | → |

Overview
- Legislative body: Seanad Éireann
- Jurisdiction: Ireland
- Meeting place: Leinster House
- Term: 8 September 1943 – 5 July 1944
- Government: 3rd Government of Ireland
- Members: 60
- Cathaoirleach: Seán Goulding (FF)
- Leas-Chathaoirleach: Michael Tierney (FG)
- Leader of the Seanad: William Quirke (FF)

The 4th Seanad was in office from 1943 to 1944. An election to Seanad Éireann, the senate of the Oireachtas (Irish parliament), followed the 1944 general election to the 11th Dáil. The senators served until the close of poll for the 5th Seanad in 1944.

== Cathaoirleach ==
On 8 September 1943, Seán Goulding (FF) was proposed by Seán Gibbons (FF), the outgoing Cathaoirleach, and seconded by Helena Concannon (FF) for the position of Cathaoirleach. He was elected unopposed.

On 27 October 1943, Michael Tierney (FG) was proposed by Thomas J. O'Connell (Lab) and seconded by Henry Barniville (FG) for the position of Leas-Chathaoirleach. He was elected unopposed.

== Composition of the 4th Seanad ==
There are a total of 60 seats in the Seanad: 43 were elected on five vocational panels, 6 were elected from two university constituencies and 11 were nominated by the Taoiseach.

The following table shows the composition by party when the 4th Seanad first met on 8 September 1943.

| Origin Party | Vocational panels | | | | | NUI | DU | Nominated | Total |
| Origin Party | Admin | Agri | Cult & Educ | Ind & Comm | Labour | NUI | DU | Nominated | Total |
|---|---|---|---|---|---|---|---|---|---|
| Fianna Fáil | 3 | 6 | 1 | 3 | 0 | 1 | 0 | 8 | 22 |
| Fine Gael | 2 | 1 | 2 | 2 | 2 | 2 | 0 | 0 | 11 |
| Labour Party | 0 | 0 | 1 | 0 | 4 | 0 | 0 | 1 | 6 |
| Clann na Talmhan | 0 | 1 | 0 | 0 | 0 | 0 | 0 | 0 | 1 |
| Independent | 2 | 3 | 1 | 4 | 5 | 0 | 3 | 2 | 20 |
| Total | 7 | 11 | 5 | 9 | 11 | 3 | 3 | 11 | 60 |

== List of senators ==
- Note: The entries for Senators who were elected or appointed to fill vacancies are shown in italics

| Name | Panel | Party | Notes |
|---|---|---|---|
| Joseph Hannigan | Administrative Panel | Independent | |
| Michael Hayes | Administrative Panel | Fine Gael | |
| Denis Healy | Administrative Panel | Fianna Fáil | |
| Michael Hearne | Administrative Panel | Fianna Fáil | |
| James McGee | Administrative Panel | Independent | |
| Edward Monahan | Administrative Panel | Fine Gael | |
| Richard Walsh | Administrative Panel | Fianna Fáil | |
| Patrick Baxter | Agricultural Panel | Clann na Talmhan | |
| Michael Colbert | Agricultural Panel | Fianna Fáil | Elected to 12th Dáil at the general election on 30 May 1944 |
| John Counihan | Agricultural Panel | Independent | |
| Seán Gibbons | Agricultural Panel | Fianna Fáil | |
| Daniel Hogan | Agricultural Panel | Fianna Fáil | |
| Patrick Kehoe | Agricultural Panel | Fianna Fáil | |
| Peter Lynch | Agricultural Panel | Independent | |
| Dominick MacCabe | Agricultural Panel | Independent | |
| William Quirke | Agricultural Panel | Fianna Fáil | |
| Gerard Sweetman | Agricultural Panel | Fine Gael | |
| Thomas Walsh | Agricultural Panel | Fianna Fáil | |
| Patrick Doyle | Cultural and Educational Panel | Fine Gael | |
| Thomas J. O'Connell | Cultural and Educational Panel | Labour | |
| Seán O'Donovan | Cultural and Educational Panel | Fianna Fáil | |
| Donal O'Sullivan | Cultural and Educational Panel | Independent | |
| James Parkinson | Cultural and Educational Panel | Fine Gael | |
| Joseph Brennan | Industrial and Commercial Panel | Independent | |
| Daniel Corkery | Industrial and Commercial Panel | Fianna Fáil | |
| James Crosbie | Industrial and Commercial Panel | Fine Gael | |
| Seán Goulding | Industrial and Commercial Panel | Fianna Fáil | |
| Peter Trainor Kelly | Industrial and Commercial Panel | Independent | |
| David Madden | Industrial and Commercial Panel | Fine Gael | |
| John Maguire | Industrial and Commercial Panel | Independent | |
| Frank O'Beirne | Industrial and Commercial Panel | Fianna Fáil | |
| Frank J. Hugh O'Donnell | Industrial and Commercial Panel | Independent | |
| John Butler | Labour Panel | Fine Gael | |
| Michael Colgan | Labour Panel | Independent | |
| Thomas Foran | Labour Panel | Labour | |
| Frederick Hawkins | Labour Panel | Independent | |
| Thomas Hayden | Labour Panel | Labour | |
| James Johnston | Labour Panel | Independent | |
| Thomas Kennedy | Labour Panel | Labour | |
| Sam Kyle | Labour Panel | Labour | |
| Richard Mulcahy | Labour Panel | Fine Gael | Elected to 12th Dáil at the general election on 30 May 1944 |
| Seán Ruane | Labour Panel | Independent | |
| Michael Smyth | Labour Panel | Independent | |
| Henry Barniville | National University of Ireland | Fine Gael | |
| Helena Concannon | National University of Ireland | Fianna Fáil | |
| Michael Tierney | National University of Ireland | Fine Gael | |
| William Fearon | Dublin University | Independent | |
| T. C. Kingsmill Moore | Dublin University | Independent | |
| Robert Rowlette | Dublin University | Independent | |
| Seán Campbell | Nominated by the Taoiseach | Labour | |
| Robert Farnan | Nominated by the Taoiseach | Fianna Fáil | |
| T. V. Honan | Nominated by the Taoiseach | Fianna Fáil | |
| Sir John Keane | Nominated by the Taoiseach | Independent | |
| Margaret L. Kennedy | Nominated by the Taoiseach | Fianna Fáil | |
| William Magennis | Nominated by the Taoiseach | Independent | |
| Liam Ó Buachalla | Nominated by the Taoiseach | Fianna Fáil | |
| Pádraic Ó Máille | Nominated by the Taoiseach | Fianna Fáil | |
| Peter O'Loghlen | Nominated by the Taoiseach | Fianna Fáil | Elected to 12th Dáil at the general election on 30 May 1944 |
| Margaret Mary Pearse | Nominated by the Taoiseach | Fianna Fáil | |
| Matthew Stafford | Nominated by the Taoiseach | Fianna Fáil | |

== Changes ==
| Date | Panel | Loss | Gain | Note |
|---|---|---|---|---|
| 30 May 1944 | Agricultural Panel | Fianna Fáil | | Michael Colbert elected to the 12th Dáil at the 1944 general election |
| 30 May 1944 | Labour Panel | Fine Gael | | Richard Mulcahy elected to the 12th Dáil at the 1944 general election |
| 30 May 1944 | Nominated by the Taoiseach | Fianna Fáil | | Peter O'Loghlen elected to the 12th Dáil at the 1944 general election |
