= Athlone Crucifixion Plaque =

8th century Irish Bronze sculpture

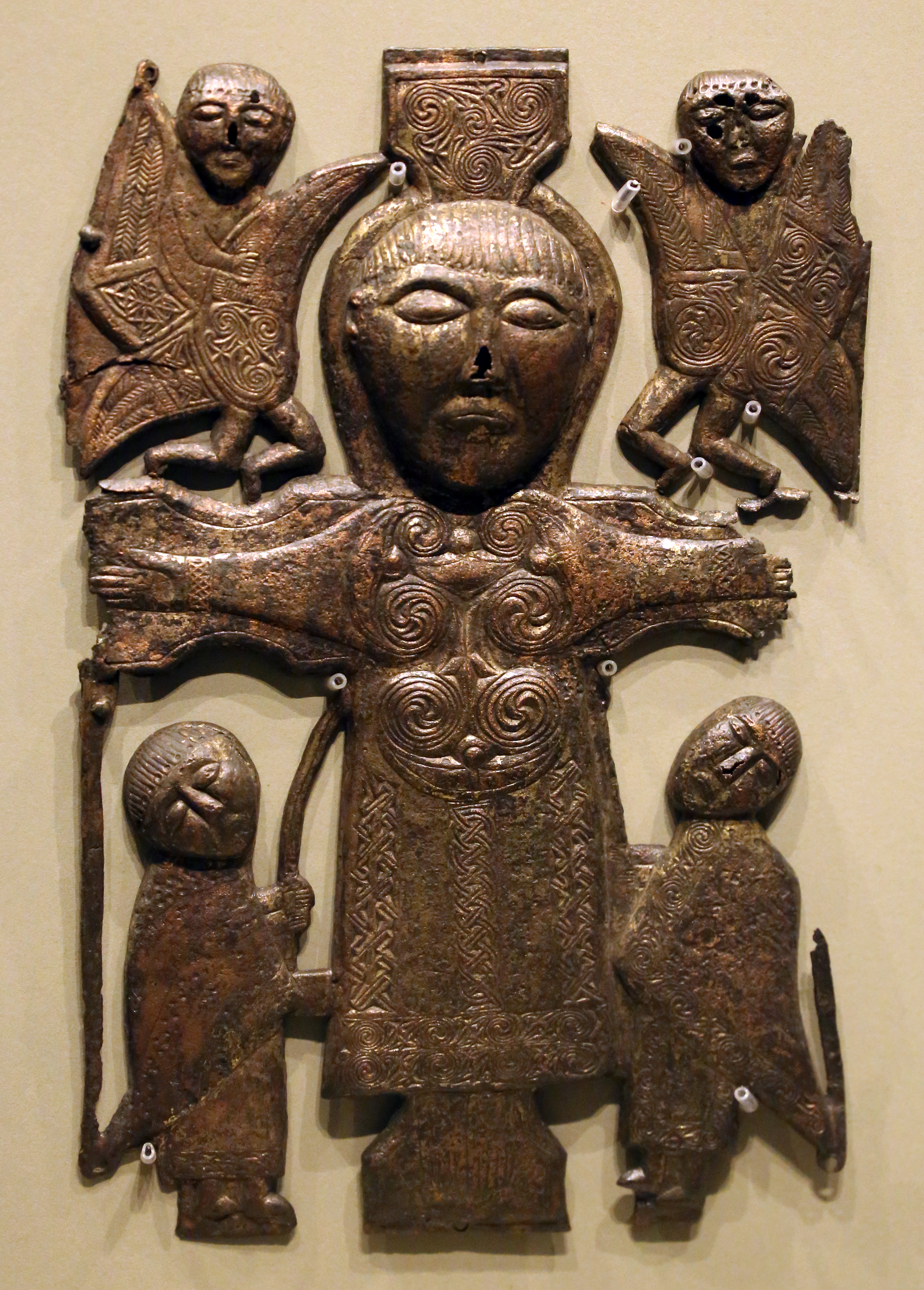
- Material: Bronze, formerly gilded. openwork, repoussé
- Size: 21 cm (8.3 in) x 12.5 cm (4.9 in)
- Created: Late 7th or early 8th-century
- Period/culture: Early Medieval, Insular
- Place: Rinnegan, near Athlone, Ireland
- Present location: National Museum of Ireland, Dublin
- Identification: NMI R554

The Athlone Crucifixion Plaque (or Rinnegan or St. John Crucifixion Plaque) is a late 7th or early 8th-century Irish gilt-bronze crucifixion plaque found in the 19th-century in the churchyard of St. John's on the head of Lough Ree, near Rinnegan, County Roscommon. It is decorated on one side only, and shows the still alive Christ on the cross. Above each arm of the cross are angels with three wings, and below are the biblical Roman soldiers or bystanders Stephaton and Longinus. The plaque is one of the earliest known representations of the crucifixion in Irish art, and outside of illuminated manuscripts, a rare example of representation in Insular art.

The Athlone Plaque is the earliest of the eight early medieval Irish crucifixion plaques to have survived. At 21 cm (8.3 in), it is the largest example, and is widely considered the most accomplished. Its dating to the late 7th or early 8th centuries is estimated on an art-historial baisis, given it curvilinear designs, including spirals and interlace. While the precise function of these plaques is unknown, their multiple rivet or nail holes indicate that they were originally attached to larger wooden ecclesiastical objects such as processional crosses, book shrines or altarpieces.

The plaque was hidden or buried at some point in the early medieval period to protect it from plunder. While the details of its rediscovery in the early 19th-century are unknown, iron and salt deposits in the hollows of its reverse indicate that it was buried in soil. The plaque has been in the permanent collection of the National Museum of Ireland (NMI) in Dublin since the late 19th century.

== Function ==
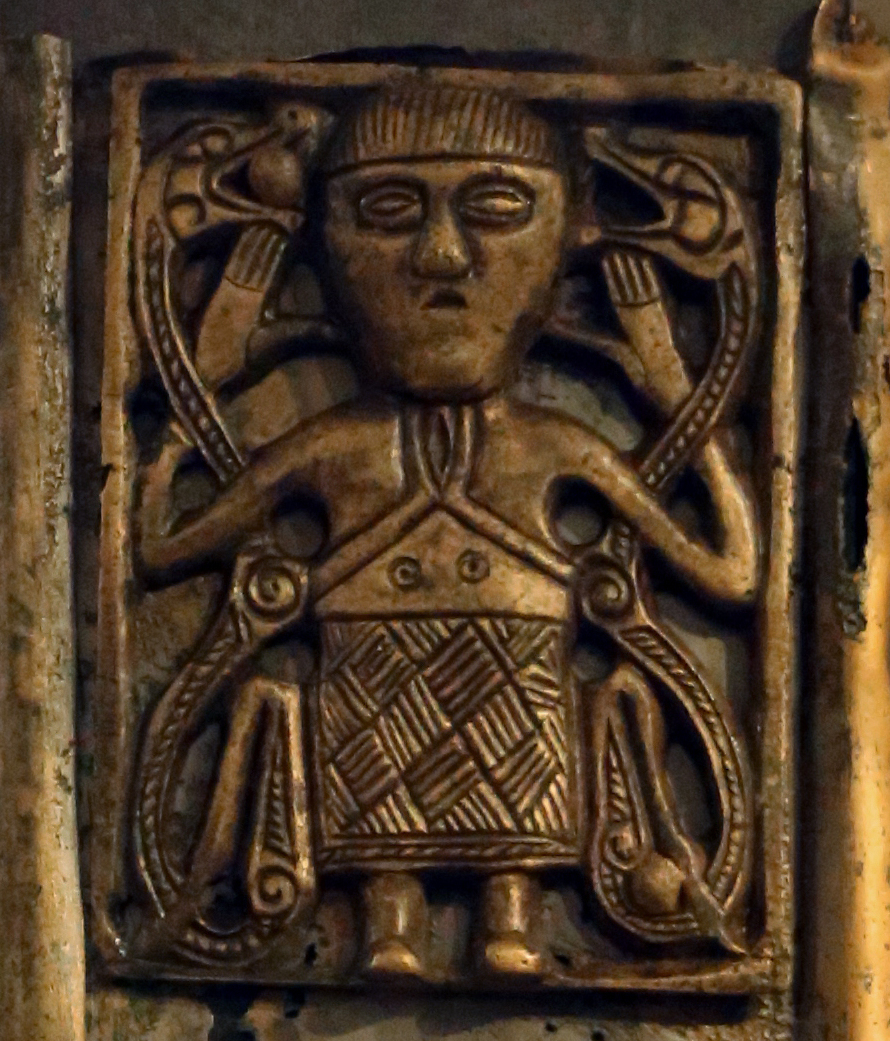
Panel on the upper arm of the 8th- or 9th-century Tully Lough Cross, NMI

Because of its early dating, large size and find spot on the east coast of Ireland, archaeologists consider the Rinnegan Plaque as separate from the other surviving Irish Crucifixion plaques.

The precise function of the plaques is unknown. The reverse of the Athlone plaque is unadorned but has rivets and nail holes along the edges, indicating that it was once attached to a larger wooden object. Thus most art historians conclude that they had a secondary function; perhalps the plaques adorned book covers, altar frontals or processional crosses.

The art historian Peter Harbison, who in 1980 first described the extant crucifixion plaques as a group, favors pax-plates, noting that many show wear around Christ's head, indicating that they may have been passed around to be kissed during masses.

== Dating ==
The ecclesiastical site at St. John's dates back to antiquity, and the plaque is believed to have been discovered buried near an iron and bronze handbell. Nothing is known of the circumstances around its commission or production. It is usually dated to the early 8th-century based on the interlocking peltae (crescent-shaped shields) and spiral designs on Christ's breastplate and the band above his head. In 1977, the historian Frank Mitchell suggested that the absence of typical insular zoomorphic animal designs suggests that it was created in the late 7th-century.

== Description ==
The figures were achieved by hammering the bronze from behind, while the decorative elements were added via engraving and repoussé. The plaque's frame is severely damaged, but may originally have formed a continuous border.

=== Christ ===
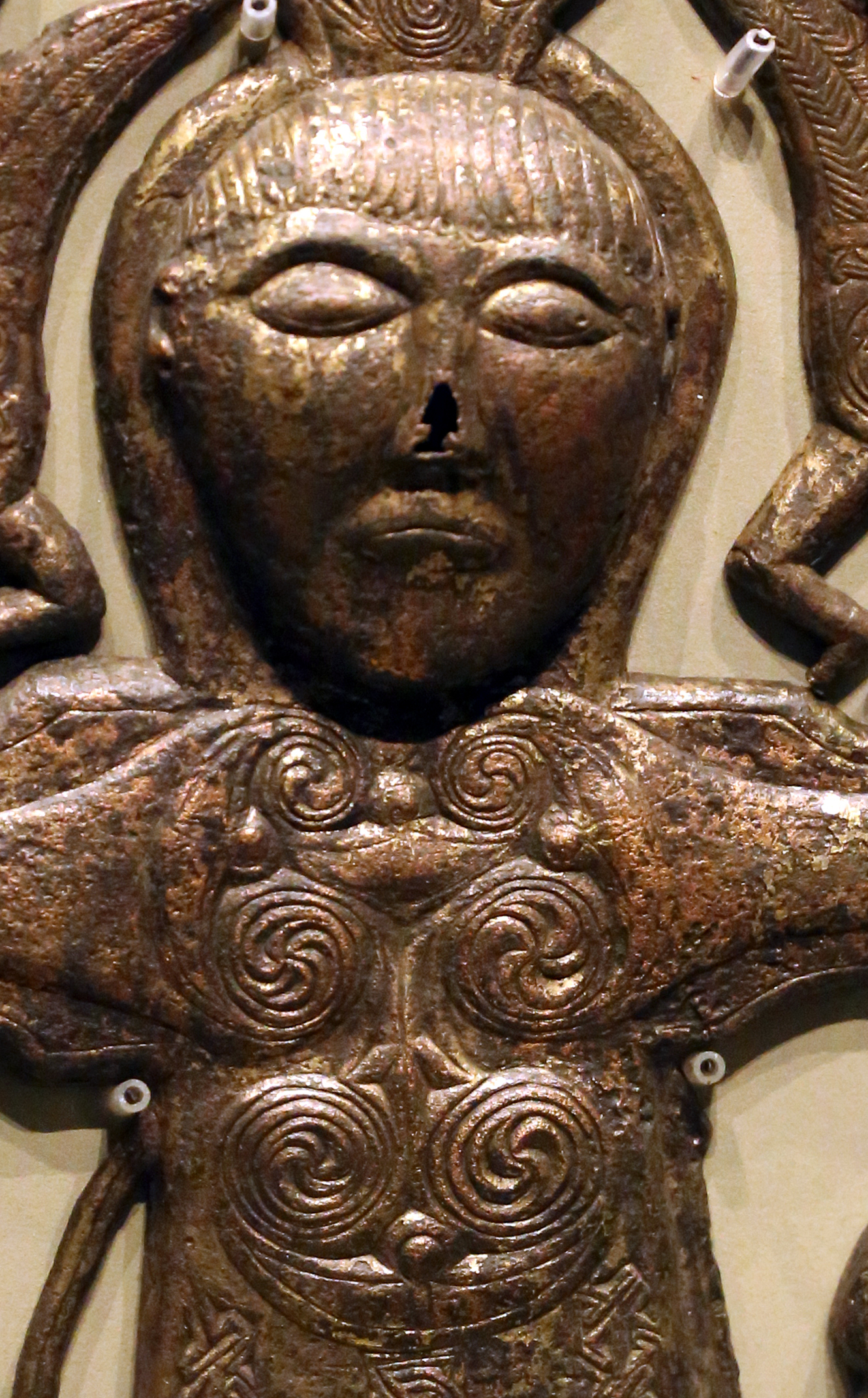
Detail of Christ's head and the spirals on his chest

Christ is dramatically oversized compared to the other figures. He is upright and front-facing, has a mask-like face reminiscent of earlier La Tène art, and does not wear a beard.

He wears a long-sleeved tunic which reaches to his wrists and ankles. The cuffs and hem of his tunic are heavily decorated by elaborate interlace, fret and running Celtic spiral patterns. The long robe has a number of symbolic meanings. It marks him as a person of substance as opposed to the common criminals who are always shown in earlier and contemporary manuscript and sculptural depictions wearing loin-cloths.

He appears to be alive, given that one eye is open and that he is standing on the centre of the cross rather than hanging from it. As with all of the surviving examples, his feet point inwards and downwards. Along with his hands and the lower ends of the spear and lance, his feet overlap the frame.

The thin border around his head is assumed to be a halo.

The large and prominent cluster of spirals on his chest resembles similar patterns on the fragment from an 8th or early 9th-century stone Crucifixion found on the Calf of Man and held in the Manx Museum. They appear to form either a shield or a protective breastplate, perhaps indicating the self-sacrifice aspect of the crucifixion. In addition, the breast ornament and his elaborate garments allude to Christ as the "anointed one" and eternal priest. The art-historians Michael Herren and Shirley Ann Brown describe him as dressed in the "holy garments" of the Old Testament priest-kings Araon and his sons Nadab and Abihu" as described in Exodus 218:1–5.

=== Angels ===
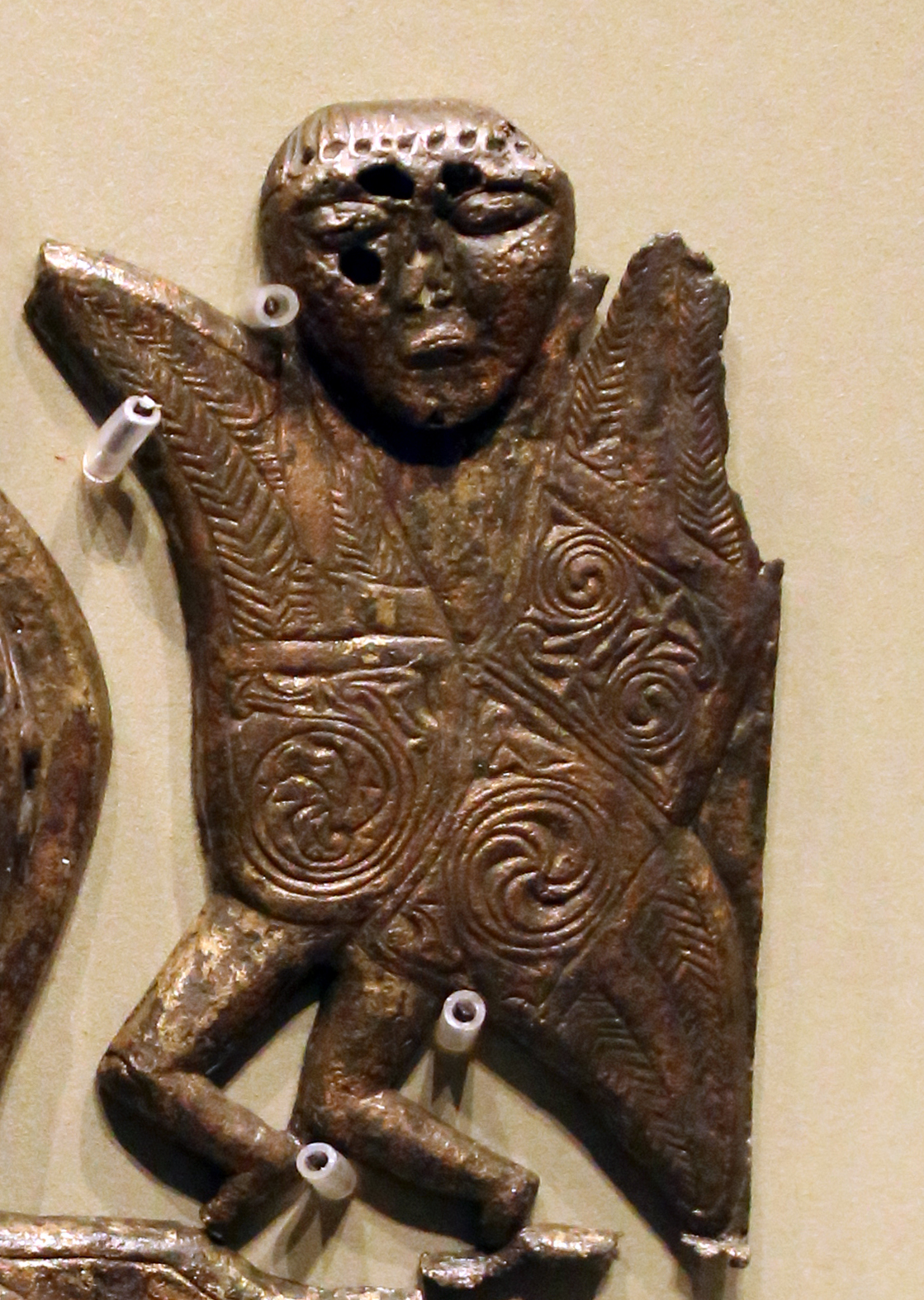
Detail of the angel on the upper right

Two attendant angels hover above Christ, shown in profile but looking outwards. They have triple wings decorated with herringbone patterns. Their knees are bended, and each appears to be holding objects which may be daggers or short swords.

=== The cross ===
The cross is barely visible behind Christ's body; however, the circles and rivet holes indicate that he has been nailed to it. It is debatable whether the cross conforms to the typical Latin form (i.e. the cross vertical beam extends above the cross-bea) typically used in early Irish art, or is a T-shaped crosscrux commissa.

Unusually, the cross has curved (or concave) rather than right angles at the junctures of the arms and the horizontal shaft. The upper terminal of the vertical bar emerges from his head, while the lower terminal contains his feet.

=== Soldiers ===
As with all of the Crucifixion Plaques, the Roman soldiers Stephaton, the lance-bearer offering vinegar to Christ, and the lance-bearer Longinus (the lance-bearer), often stand on either side of Christ's feet. The band above Christ's head contains ribbon interlace, and his breastplate is decorated with interlocking c-shaped scrolls and spirals. Longinus is positioned in the lower left quadrant, thrusting a spear into Christ's chest, although the wound is not visible.

== Influences and iconography ==
The Athlone plaques is one of the earliest known representations of the crucifixion in Irish art.

It's structure and decorations have been compared to the crucifixion folio (f.38v) in the 9th-century Southampton Psalter and to an 11th or 12th-century open-work brass crucifixion plaque in the British Museum. In addition, it seems heavily influenced by a miniature of the crucifixion (folio 51) in the 8th-century Irish Gospels of St. Gall. Similar elements include Christ's lack of a beard, his halo, the dots lining Longinus' garment and especially the large spiral ornament decorating his chest.

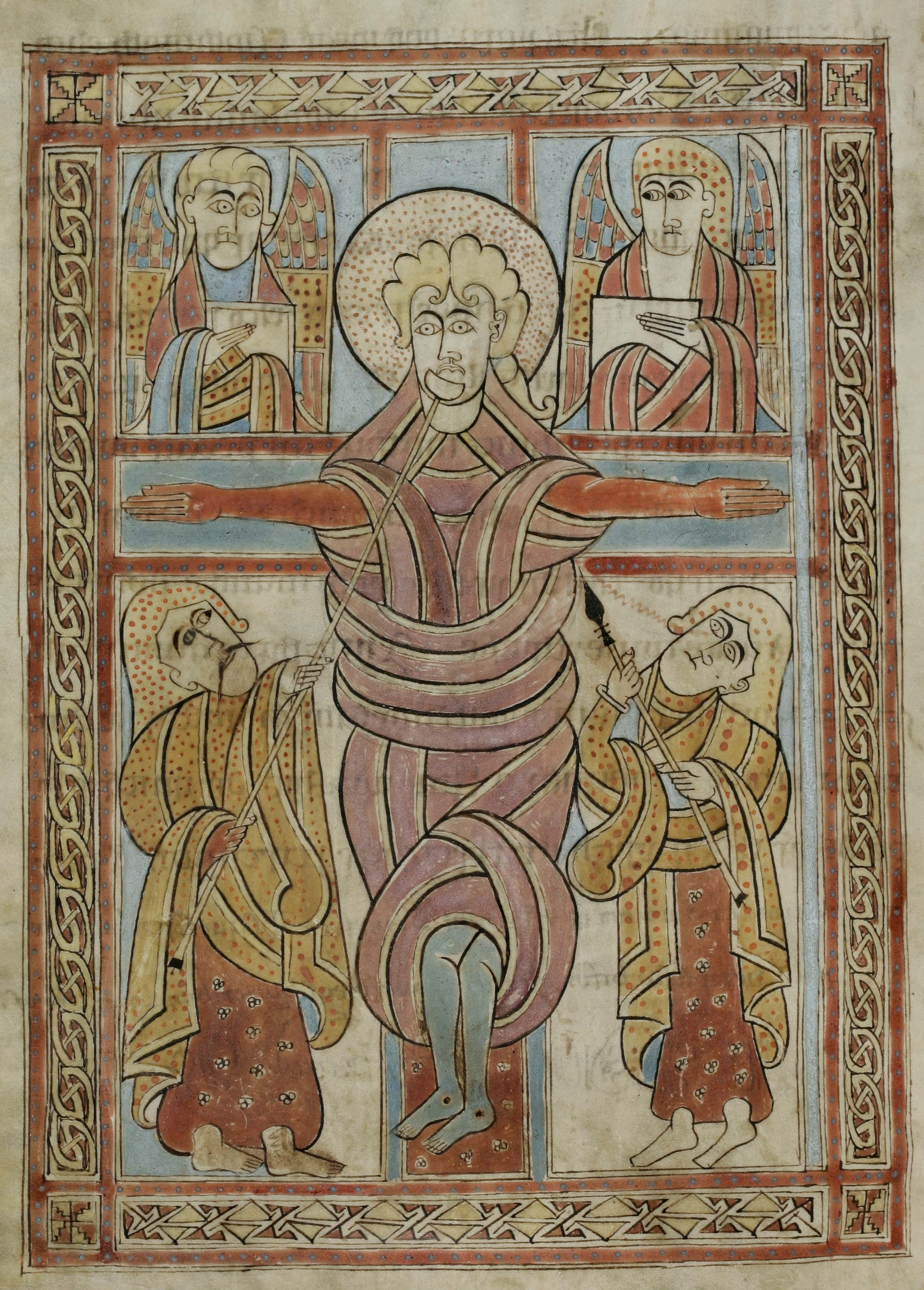
Crucifixion miniature from the Irish Gospels of St. Gall, 8th-century

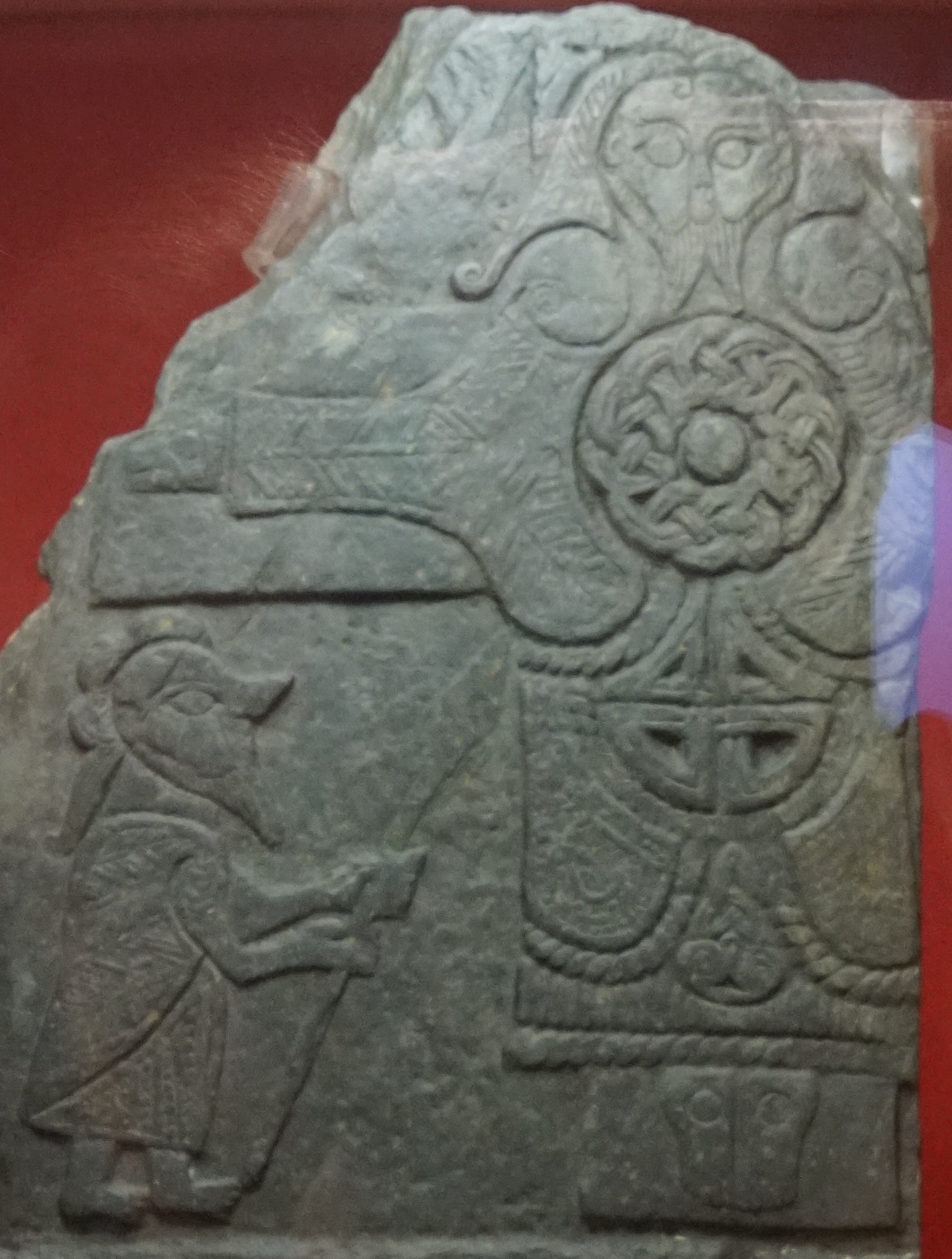
Drawing of an 8th or 9th–century Crucifixion, Calf of Man, likely based on an Irish plaque.

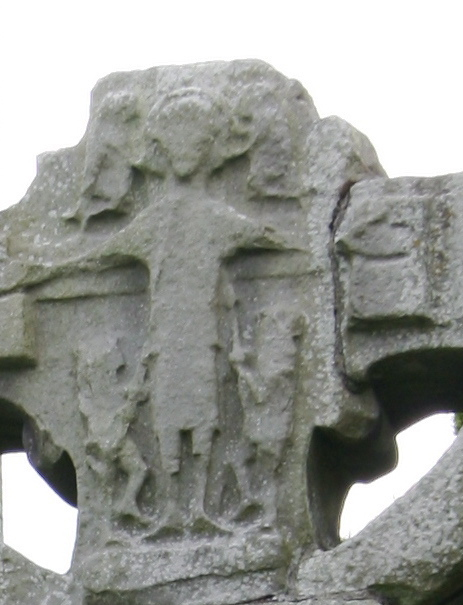
Detail of the "unfinished" high cross in the Abbey of Kells, County Meath, Ireland. 9th-century

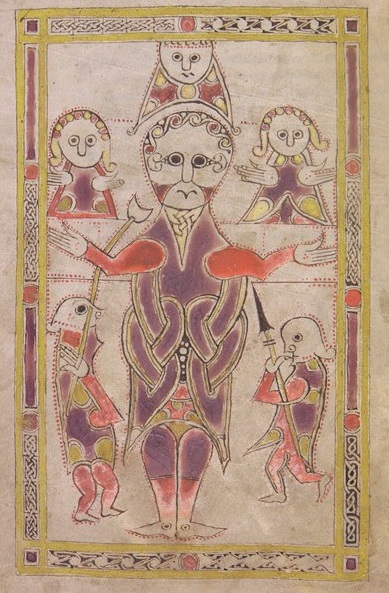
Southampton Psalter, f.38v; 9th-century or after

== Provenance and condition ==
The earliest surviving printed reference to the Athlone plaque is in John Stuart's 1867 "Sculptured Stones of Scotland, Volume II", where the antiquarian Margaret Stokes is recounted as having told her fellow antiquarian George Petrie that the plaque was "from Clonmacnoise —the central seat of art in Ireland— and brought to the Academy from Athlone", and that Petrie believed it to be "1,000 years old." This led to some confusion as to its origin, with some antiquarians believing it had been rediscovered at Clonmacnoise and others assuming it had been made in Clonmacnois but had a find spot in Rinnegan, just outside Athlone, County Westmeath, leading to it often being known as the "Rinnegan Crucifixion Plaque".

However, according to a November 1861 handwritten record found during the late 20th-century in the Royal Irish Academy's "Book of Inventory", the Athlone plaque is described as having been found "at St. John's, near Athlone", and was acquired on 19 July of that year from "Wm. Sproule, for £8". Although there is little other evidence to associate the plaque with St. John's, the plaque is today usually so-called as St. John's burial ground is located just outside the townland of Rinnagan, County Roscommon.

While the details of its rediscovery are unknown, the iron salt deposits in the hollows of its reverse indicate that it had been buried in soil for centuries.

The plaque has suffered considerable damage and would have been far more decorative when first produced. The shine on the copper is somewhat blunted, while much of the gilt has been lost, as is most of Christ's right arm. The tunic was originally lined with more interlace and fretwork.

== Sources ==
- Gougaud, Dom Louis; Armstrong, E.C.R. "The Earliest Irish Representations of the Crucifixion". Journal of the Royal Society of Antiquaries of Ireland, Sixth Series, volume 10, number 2, December 31, 1920. pp. 128–139. JSTOR 25514570 ISSN 0079-497X
- Harbison, Peter. "The Bronze Crucifixion Plaque said to be from St John's (Rinnegan), near Athlone". ̄Journal of Irish Archaeology volume 11, 1984. pp. 1–17. JSTOR 30001578
- Harbison, Peter. "A lost crucifixion plaque of Clonmacnoise type found in County Mayo". ̄Irish Midland Studies: Essays in Commemoration of N.W. English. Athlone, 1980. ISBN 0-9503-4281-5
- Herren, Michael; Brown, Shirley Ann. Christ in Celtic Christianity: Britain and Ireland from the Fifth to the Tenth Century. Boydell Press, 2012. ISBN 978-1-8438-3713-8
- Johnson, Ruth. "Irish Crucifixion Plaques: Viking Age or Romanesque?". Journal of the Royal Society of Antiquaries of Ireland, volume 128, 1998. JSTOR 25549845 ISSN 0079-497X
- MacDermott, Máire. "An Openwork Crucifixion Plaque from Clonmacnoise". The Journal of the Royal Society of Antiquaries of Ireland, volume 84, no. 1, 1954. JSTOR 25509155 ISSN 0079-497X
- Mitchell, Frank. "Foreign Influence and the Beginnings of Christian Art". In: Treasures of early Irish art, 1500 B.C. to 1500 A.D: From the collections of the National Museum of Ireland, Royal Irish Academy, Trinity College Dublin Archived 6 June 2021 at the Wayback Machine. NY: Metropolitan Museum of Art, 1977. ISBN 0-8709-9164-7
- Moss, Rachel. Medieval c. 400—c. 1600, Art and Architecture of Ireland series. New Haven (CT): Yale University Press, 2014. ISBN 978-0-3001-7919-4
- Murray, Griffin. "Irish crucifixion plaques: a reassessment. In: Mullins, Juliet; Ni Ghradaigh, Jenifer (eds): Envisioning Christ on the Cross: Ireland and the Early Medieval West. Dublin: eds J. Mullins, J. Ní Ghrádaigh and R. Hawtree, 2014. ISBN 978-1-8468-2387-9
- Ó Floinn, Raghnal; Wallace, Patrick (eds). Treasures of the National Museum of Ireland: Irish Antiquities. Dublin: National Museum of Ireland, 2002. ISBN 0-9503-4281-5
- O'Toole, Fintan. A History of Ireland in 100 Objects Archived 26 October 2021 at the Wayback Machine. Dublin: Royal Irish Academy, 2013. ISBN 978-1-9089-9615-2
