= Kells Crozier =

Medieval Irish clerical staff

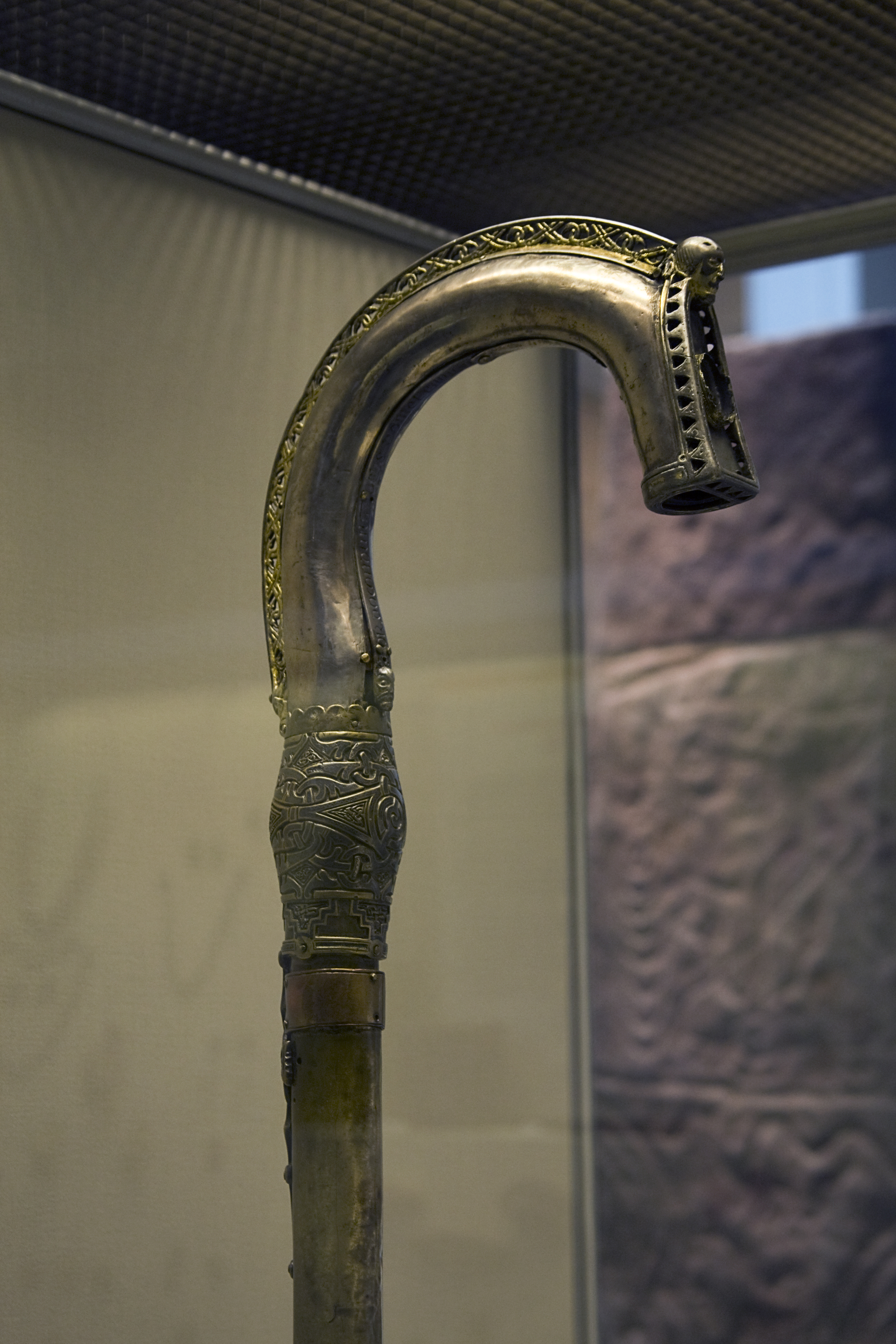
- Kells crozier
- Material: Silver and copper
- Size: 133 cm long
- Created: 9th-11th Centuries AD
- Present location: British Museum, London
- Registration: 1859.2-21.1

The Kells crozier or British Museum Crozier is an early medieval Irish Insular crozier. It is often known as the "Kells Crozier", indicating an associating with the Abbey of Kells, although no evidence of this exists, and most historians accept that it is of uncertain providence. The crozier is fully intact, although some of the ornamentation is in poor condition.

Its origin before it appeared for sale in London in 1850 is lost, and it has been part of the British Museum's collection since 1859.

== Description ==
The Kells Crozier was made by various craftsmen over three different phases between the late 9th and 11th century AD. While the core of the crozier is wooden, the crook is made of silver and the staff is covered in a copper alloy sheet which was later covered with silver mounts or knobs filled with animal interlace typical of the period. The curved crest of the crook is elaborately decorated with interlinking birds; while a human head is placed on the drop at the end of the crook. This is where the crozier would have once held some holy relics. The drop-plate once held semi-precious stones that are now lost.

Its full length measures about 133 cm.

== Origin and provenance ==
Underneath the crest of the crook is engraved an inscription in mixed Latin and the old Irish language: ordo conduilis ocius do mel finnen, which, roughly translated, asks supplicants to pray for Cúduilig and Maelfinnén who were involved in its refurbishment. Scholars have identified these names with individuals who were connected with the important Irish monastic settlement at Kells, County Meath. However, recent research has cast doubts about this connection.

The crozier was found without explanation in the cupboard of a London solicitor's office in the middle of the nineteenth century. It belonged to several owners, including Cardinal Wiseman (1802–1865), before being purchased by the British Museum.

== Reliquary ==
A key role of the Kells Crozier was to act as a repository for holy relics. Enshrining items that had once belonged to saints or church leaders, such as their bones or fragments of their clothing, was an important feature of religious life in early medieval Ireland. Other reliquaries common to Ireland in this period were the bell shrines, such as St Patrick's Bell in the National Museum of Ireland and St Conall Cael's Bell in the British Museum.

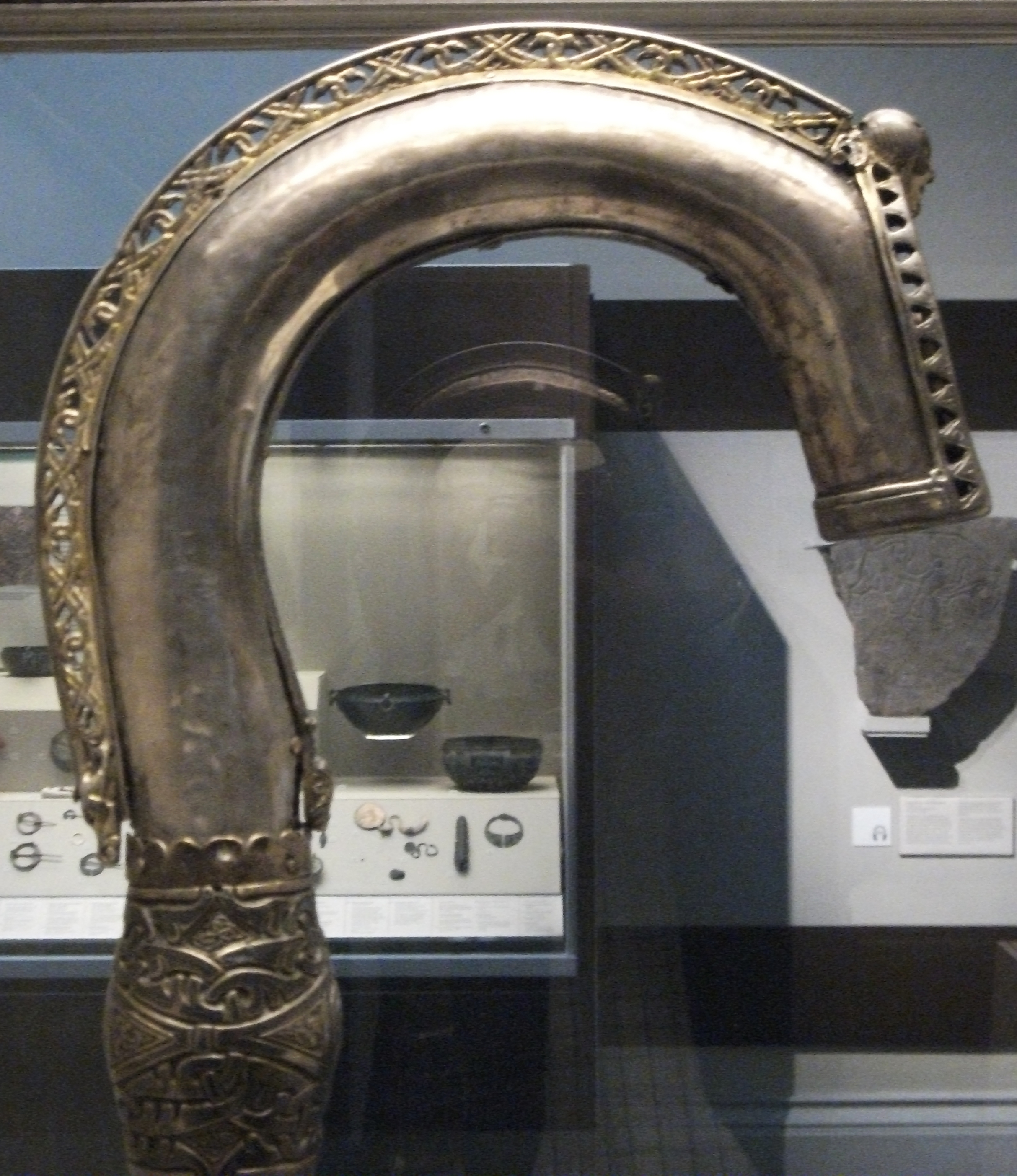
The crest of the crook

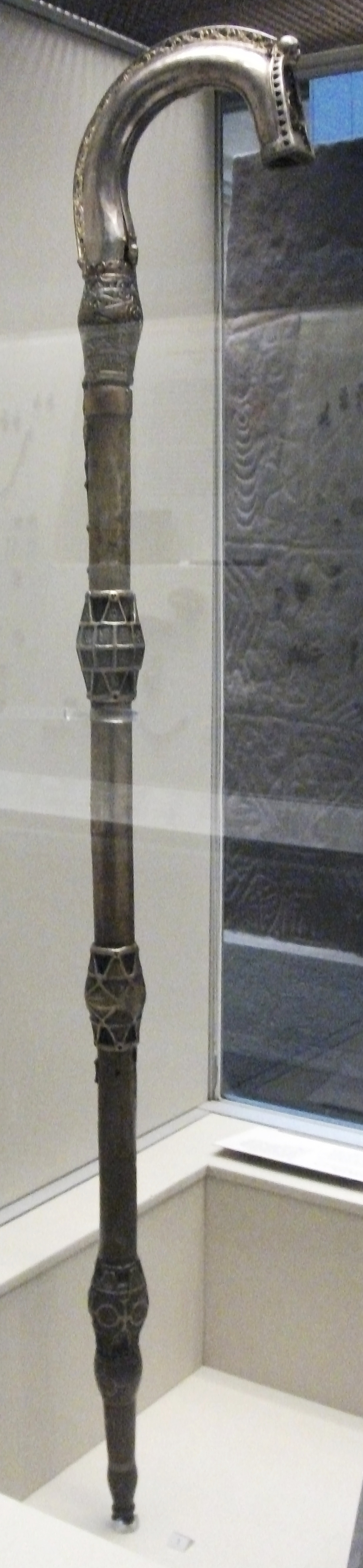
Full-length view

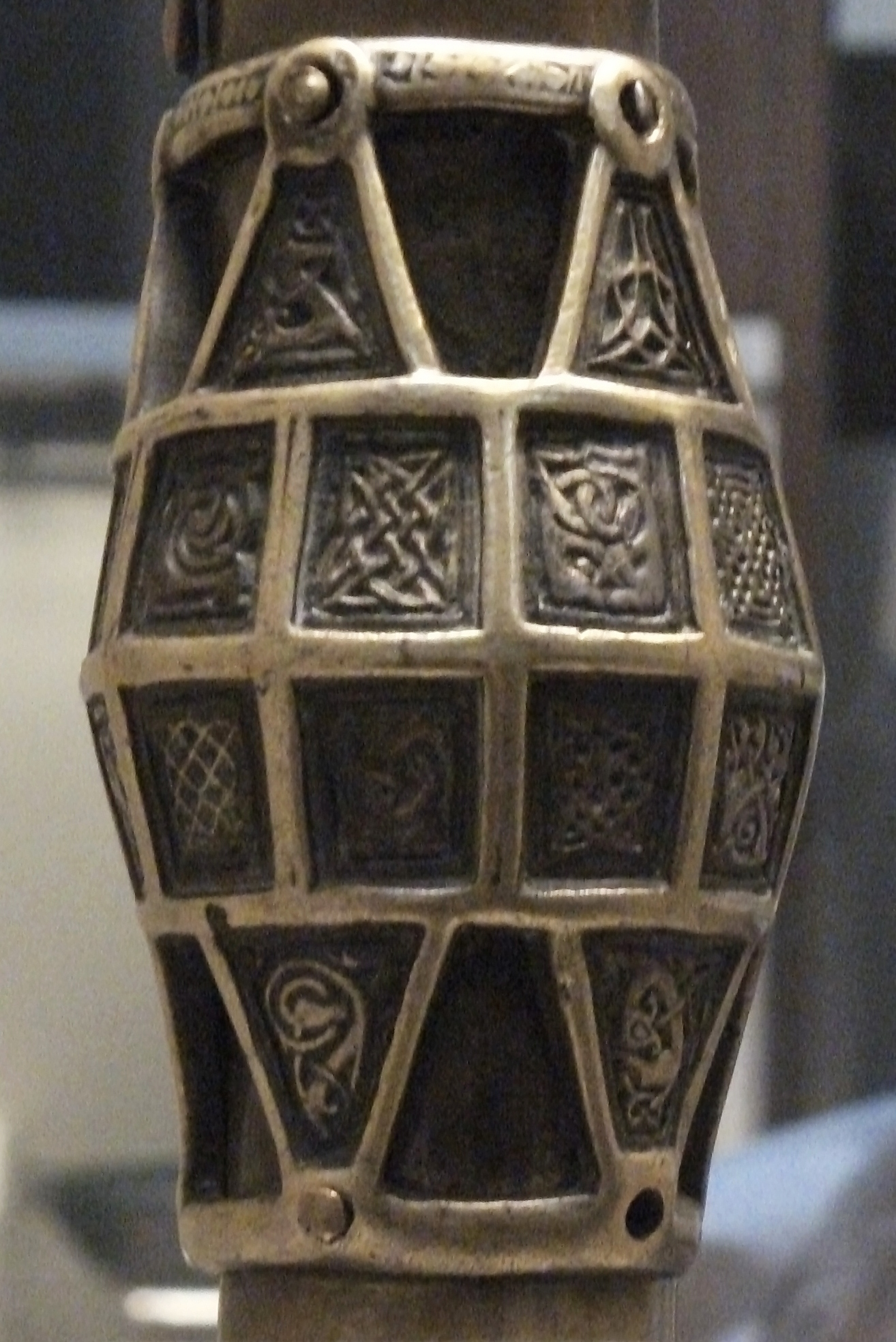
Middle knop

== See also ==
- Insular crozier

== Sources ==
- Bourke, Cormac. "A Crozier and Bell from Inishmurray and Their Place in Ninth-Century Irish Archaeology". Proceedings of the Royal Irish Academy: Archaeology, Culture, History, Literature. Dublin: Royal Irish Academy, volume 85C, 1985. JSTOR 25506128
- MacDermott, Máire. "The Kells Crozier'. Archaeologia volume 12, nr. 96, 1955
- MacDermott, Máire. "The Crosiers of St. Dympna and St. Mel and Tenth-Century Irish Metal-Work". Proceedings of the Royal Irish Academy: Archaeology, Culture, History, Literature, Volume 58, 1956. JSTOR 25505072
- Harbison, Peter. The Golden Age of Irish art. London: Thames and Hudson, 1999
- Henry, Francoise. Irish Art during the Viking Invasions. London: Methuen, 1967
- Moss, Rachel. Medieval c. 400—c. 1600. "Art and Architecture of Ireland" series. London: Yale University Press, 2014. ISBN 978-0-3001-7919-4
- Murray, Griffin."Insular-type crosiers: their construction and characteristics". Making and Meaning in Insular Art: Proceedings of the Fifth International Conference on Insular Art, 2007
- Stokes, Margaret. Early Christian Art in Ireland, Part 1. London: Chapman and Hall, 1887
