= Bell of Armagh =

Bell of Armagh may refer to either of the following medieval Irish church hand-bells:

- Former name for St. Patrick's Bell, bell made c. 500 later kept in an 11th-century shrine
- Alternative name for Bell of Ballinabeck, 10th-century bell found in the 18th century
