= Rachel Moss =

Rachel Moss may refer to:

- Rachel Moss (actress)
- Rachel Moss (art historian)
