= Michael Smyth (politician) =

Irish politician (died 1973)

Senator
- In office 8 September 1943 – 14 August 1951
- Constituency: Labour Panel

Personal details
- Died: 21 November 1973
- Party: Independent

Michael Smyth (died 21 November 1973) was an Irish politician. He was an independent member of Seanad Éireann from 1943 to 1951. He first was elected to the 4th Seanad in 1943 by the Labour Panel. He was re-elected at the 1944 and 1951 Seanad elections but lost his seat at the 1951 election.
