= 3rd Seanad =

Members of the Seanad from 1938 to 1943

←	2nd Seanad	4th Seanad	→

Overview
- Legislative body: Seanad Éireann
- Jurisdiction: Ireland
- Meeting place: Leinster House
- Term: 7 September 1938 – 14 July 1943
- Government: 2nd Government of Ireland
- Members: 60
- Cathaoirleach: Seán Gibbons (FF)
- Leas-Chathaoirleach: Michael Tierney (FG)
- Leader of the Seanad: William Quirke (FF)

The 3rd Seanad was in office from 1938 to 1943. An election to Seanad Éireann, the Senate of the Oireachtas (Irish parliament), followed the 1938 general election to the 10th Dáil. The senators served until the close of poll for the 4th Seanad in 1943.

== Cathaoirleach ==
On 7 September 1938, Seán Gibbons (FF) was proposed by Helena Concannon (FF) and seconded by Margaret Mary Pearse (FF) for the position of Cathaoirleach. He was elected unopposed.

On 16 November 1938, Patrick Baxter (CnaT) was proposed by John Counihan (Ind) and seconded by John Butler (FG) for the position of Leas-Chathaoirleach. Baxter was defeated by a vote of 15 to 28. On 23 November 1938, Michael Tierney (FG) was proposed by was proposed by James G. Douglas (Ind) and seconded by Henry Barniville (FG) for the position of Leas-Chathaoirleach. On 30 November 1938, Tierney was elected by a vote of 34 to 12.

== Composition of the 3rd Seanad ==
There are a total of 60 seats in the Seanad: 43 were elected on five vocational panels, 6 were elected from two university constituencies and 11 were nominated by the Taoiseach.

The following table shows the composition by party when the 3rd Seanad first met on 7 September 1938.

Origin Party	Vocational panels					NUI	DU	Nominated	Total
Origin Party	Admin	Agri	Cult & Educ	Ind & Comm	Labour	NUI	DU	Nominated	Total
Fianna Fáil	4	5	1	3	1	1	0	7	22
Fine Gael	2	1	3	3	1	2	0	0	12
Labour Party	0	0	0	0	6	0	0	0	6
Clann na Talmhan	0	1	0	0	0	0	0	0	1
Independent	1	4	1	3	3	0	3	4	19
Total	7	11	5	9	11	3	3	11	60

== List of senators ==
- Note: The entries for Senators who were elected or appointed to fill vacancies are shown in italics

Name	Panel	Party	Notes
Christopher Byrne	Administrative Panel	Fianna Fáil	
Desmond FitzGerald	Administrative Panel	Fine Gael	
Michael Hayes	Administrative Panel	Fine Gael	
Denis Healy	Administrative Panel	Fianna Fáil	
James McGee	Administrative Panel	Independent	
Margaret Mary Pearse	Administrative Panel	Fianna Fáil	
Thomas Ruane	Administrative Panel	Fianna Fáil	
Patrick Baxter	Agricultural Panel	Clann na Talmhan	
Neal Blaney	Agricultural Panel	Fianna Fáil	
Michael Colbert	Agricultural Panel	Fianna Fáil	
John Counihan	Agricultural Panel	Independent	
Seán Gibbons	Agricultural Panel	Fianna Fáil	
Patrick Kehoe	Agricultural Panel	Fianna Fáil	
Dominick MacCabe	Agricultural Panel	Independent	
Ross McGillycuddy	Agricultural Panel	Independent	
William O'Callaghan	Agricultural Panel	Fine Gael	
Martin O'Dwyer	Agricultural Panel	Independent	
William Quirke	Agricultural Panel	Fianna Fáil	
James Crosbie	Cultural and Educational Panel	Fine Gael	
Thomas Delany	Cultural and Educational Panel	Independent	Died on 9 July 1939
Patrick Doyle	Cultural and Educational Panel	Fine Gael	
Seán O'Donovan	Cultural and Educational Panel	Fianna Fáil	
James Parkinson	Cultural and Educational Panel	Fine Gael	
Thomas J. O'Connell	Cultural and Educational Panel	Labour	
Joseph Brennan	Industrial and Commercial Panel	Independent	
Martin Conlon	Industrial and Commercial Panel	Fine Gael	
Daniel Corkery	Industrial and Commercial Panel	Fianna Fáil	
James G. Douglas	Industrial and Commercial Panel	Independent	
Seán Goulding	Industrial and Commercial Panel	Fianna Fáil	
Peter Trainor Kelly	Industrial and Commercial Panel	Independent	
Seán MacEllin	Industrial and Commercial Panel	Fianna Fáil	
John MacLoughlin	Industrial and Commercial Panel	Fine Gael	
David Madden	Industrial and Commercial Panel	Fine Gael	
John Butler	Labour Panel	Fine Gael	
Seán Campbell	Labour Panel	Labour	
William Cummins	Labour Panel	Labour	
Thomas Foran	Labour Panel	Labour	
Frederick Hawkins	Labour Panel	Independent	
Seán Hayes	Labour Panel	Fianna Fáil	
Patrick Hogan	Labour Panel	Labour	
James Johnston	Labour Panel	Independent	
Eamonn Lynch	Labour Panel	Labour	
Peter Lynch	Labour Panel	Independent	
James Tunney	Labour Panel	Labour	
Henry Barniville	National University of Ireland	Fine Gael	
Helena Concannon	National University of Ireland	Fianna Fáil	
Michael Tierney	National University of Ireland	Fine Gael	
Ernest Alton	Dublin University	Independent	
Joseph Johnston	Dublin University	Independent	
Robert Rowlette	Dublin University	Independent	
Robert Farnan	Nominated by the Taoiseach	Fianna Fáil	
T. V. Honan	Nominated by the Taoiseach	Fianna Fáil	
Sir John Keane	Nominated by the Taoiseach	Independent	
Margaret L. Kennedy	Nominated by the Taoiseach	Fianna Fáil	
Patrick Keohane	Nominated by the Taoiseach	Independent	Died on 4 December 1939
Peadar Toner Mac Fhionnlaoich	Nominated by the Taoiseach	Independent	Died on 1 July 1942
William Magennis	Nominated by the Taoiseach	Independent	
Frank MacDermot	Nominated by the Taoiseach	Independent	
Maurice George Moore	Nominated by the Taoiseach	Fianna Fáil	Died on 8 September 1939
David Robinson	Nominated by the Taoiseach	Fianna Fáil	
Matthew Stafford	Nominated by the Taoiseach	Fianna Fáil	
Liam Ó Buachalla	Nominated by the Taoiseach	Fianna Fáil	Nominated on 7 October 1939 to replace Maurice George Moore
Laurence O'Neill	Nominated by the Taoiseach	Independent	Nominated on 2 January 1940 to replace Patrick Keohane
Pádraic Ó Máille	Nominated by the Taoiseach	Fianna Fáil	Nominated on 22 July 1942 to replace Peadar Toner Mac Fhionnlaoich

== Changes ==
Date	Panel	Loss	Gain	Note
9 July 1939	Cultural and Educational Panel	Independent		Death of Thomas Delany
8 September 1939	Nominated by the Taoiseach	Independent		Death of Maurice George Moore
7 October 1939	Nominated by the Taoiseach		Fianna Fáil	Liam Ó Buachalla nominated to replace Maurice George Moore
4 December 1939	Nominated by the Taoiseach	Independent		Death of Patrick Keohane
2 January 1940	Nominated by the Taoiseach		Independent	Laurence O'Neill nominated to replace Patrick Keohane
22 January 1941	Cultural and Educational Panel		Labour	Thomas J. O'Connell elected at a by-election to replace Thomas Delany
1 July 1942	Nominated by the Taoiseach	Independent		Death of Peadar Toner Mac Fhionnlaoich
22 July 1942	Nominated by the Taoiseach		Fianna Fáil	Pádraic Ó Máille nominated to replace Peadar Toner Mac Fhionnlaoich
23 June 1943	Administrative Panel	Fianna Fáil		Christopher Byrne elected to the 11th Dáil at the 1943 general election
23 June 1943	Agricultural Panel	Fianna Fáil		Neal Blaney elected to the 11th Dáil at the 1943 general election
23 June 1943	Labour Panel	Labour		Patrick Hogan elected to the 11th Dáil at the 1943 general election
23 June 1943	Labour Panel	Labour		James Tunney elected to the 11th Dáil at the 1943 general election
