= Peter Trainor Kelly =

Irish politician (died 1948)

Senator
- In office 7 September 1938 – 21 April 1948
- Constituency: Industrial and Commercial Panel

Personal details
- Died: 1948
- Political party: Independent

Peter Trainor Kelly (died 1948) was an Irish insurance company manager and independent politician. From Foxrock in County Dublin, he was a member of Seanad Éireann from 1938 to 1948. He was first elected to the 3rd Seanad in 1938 by the Industrial and Commercial Panel. He was re-elected at the 1943 and 1944 Seanad elections but lost his seat at the 1948 election. His election in 1944 was a surprise as he had announced his withdrawal during the election campaign. In 1939, Kelly presented to the Seanad a reduced-size replica of the Bell of Ballinabeck, which has since been used by the Cathaoirleach.
