= John Maguire (senator) =

Irish politician

Senator
- In office 8 September 1943 – 18 August 1944
- Constituency: Industrial and Commercial Panel

Personal details
- Party: Independent

John Aloysius Maguire was an Irish politician. He was an independent member of Seanad Éireann from 1943 to 1944. He was elected to the 4th Seanad in 1943 on the Industrial and Commercial Panel. He lost his seat at the 1944 Seanad election.
