= David Robinson (Irish politician) =

Irish politician (1882–1943)

Senator
- In office 27 April 1938 – 8 September 1943
- Constituency: Nominated by the Taoiseach

Senator
- In office 9 December 1931 – 29 May 1936

Personal details
- Born: 11 August 1882 Dublin, Ireland
- Died: 21 August 1943 (aged 61) County Wicklow, Ireland
- Party: Fianna Fáil
- Education: Trinity College Dublin

Military service
- Allegiance: Canada
- Branch/service: Canadian Army
- Years of service: 1914–1918
- Rank: Captain
- Unit: 19th Alberta Dragoons
- Battles/wars: World War I
- Awards: Distinguished Service Order; Croix de Guerre

David Lubbock Robinson (11 August 1882 – 21 August 1943) was an Irish Fianna Fáil politician and a prominent figure in County Wicklow during the Irish War of Independence and the Irish Civil War.

== Early life ==
He was born in Dublin in 1882 to J.J. Robinson, who was Rector of Delgany and later the Dean of St Anne's Cathedral, Belfast. His grandfather, John Robinson, was the owner of the Daily Express newspaper in Dublin. His mother, Henrietta Harriet Robinson (née Lubbock) and a sister of the first Lord Avebury. He was educated at St Columba's College, Dublin and Trinity College Dublin and qualified as a solicitor. He was a keen hockey enthusiast and represented Ireland at international level.

== World War I ==
After he qualified he travelled to Canada and during World War I he enlisted in the 19th Alberta Dragoons as a private and was commissioned to the Royal Marine Artillery. He had a distinguished military career and was awarded the Distinguished Service Order by the British Government and the Croix de Guerre. He had lost an eye and was badly wounded in both legs during his years at the front.

== Easter Rising and aftermath ==
His cousin, Robert Barton, had resigned as a British officer after the 1916 Easter Rising and was elected as a Sinn Féin Teachta Dála at the 1918 general election for the West Wicklow constituency. His other cousin, Erskine Childers, used his yacht, the Asgard, to transport guns from Germany to Ireland on behalf of the Irish Volunteers. He too was a former British Army Officer that became more sympathetic with the cause of Irish independence after the events of the Rising.

== War of Independence and Civil War ==
Robinson took an active part in the War of Independence in Wicklow. He opposed the Anglo-Irish Treaty and fought on the Republican side in the Civil War. He was present in Annamoe, County Wicklow when his cousin, Erskine, was arrested by Free State Troops and taken to Dublin which would result in his court-martial and execution. Robinson was himself arrested in 1922 and spent forty days on hunger strike during his eighteen months' internment in Mountjoy jail.

== Political career ==
He was one of seven successful Fianna Fáil candidates who secured election to the Free State Seanad at the 1931 Seanad election, securing a nine-year term. Robinson became Leas-Chathaoirleach of the Seanad on 24 February 1936, after the resignation of Michael Comyn. He remained a member of the Seanad until its abolition in 1936. In 1938 he was nominated by Taoiseach Éamon de Valera to the newly formed Seanad Éireann. He was nominated again to the 3rd Seanad but did not seek re-election in 1943. He was also the Secretary of the Irish Red Cross Society when it was inaugurated.

He never married, and died at Delgany, County Wicklow at the age of 61.
