= 1933 Dublin University by-election =

By-election to the 8th Dáil

- 13 October 1933
	Rowlette
Nominee	Robert Rowlette
Party	Independent
First preferences	Unopposed
TD before election
Sir James Craig
Independent
TD after election
Robert Rowlette
Independent

A Dáil by-election was held in the constituency of Dublin University in the Irish Free State on Friday, 13 October 1933, to fill a vacancy in the 8th Dáil. It followed the death of independent TD Sir James Craig on 12 July 1933.

In 1933, Dublin University was a three-seat university constituency to which those who had received a degree other than an honorary degree from the University of Dublin or who were scholars of Trinity College Dublin, and were eligible to vote if they were not registered to vote in another constituency. The writ of election to fill the vacancy was agreed by the Dáil on 4 October 1933.

The by-election was uncontested and the independent candidate Robert Rowlette was elected. It remains the only by-election in Ireland since 1923 that was not contested. Like Craig, Rowlette was from a medical background. Rowlette was the first TD to sit in the Dáil after the removal of the Oath of Allegiance on 3 May 1933.

This was the last Dáil election for a university constituency. The Dáil constituencies of Dublin University and the National University of Ireland were abolished at the 1937 general election. Article 18.4 of the Constitution of Ireland adopted in 1937, provided that both constituencies would have three seats in the new Seanad Éireann.

Rowlette was elected to the Dublin University Seanad constituency in 1938, and served until 1944.

== Result ==
1933 Dublin University by-election (uncontested)
Party	Candidate
Independent	Robert Rowlette
Electorate: 3,260
