= Matthew Stafford (politician) =

Irish politician (c. 1852–1950)

Senator
- In office 27 April 1938 – 21 April 1948
- Constituency: Nominated by the Taoiseach

Personal details
- Born: 1852
- Died: 12 June 1950 (aged 97–98)
- Political party: Fianna Fáil

Matthew Stafford (c. 1852 – 12 June 1950) was an Irish businessman and Fianna Fáil politician. He served four terms in Seanad Éireann, over a period of ten years. He was nominated by the Taoiseach to the 2nd Seanad in 1937, the 3rd Seanad in 1938, 4th Seanad in 1943, and to the 5th Seanad in 1944. He only spoke twice in his time in the Seanad. He took part in the 1867 Fenian Rising, and as a sniper in the 1916 Easter Rising.
