= Patrick Keohane (politician) =

Irish politician (1870–1939)

Senator
- In office 10 May 1938 – 4 December 1939
- Constituency: Nominated by the Taoiseach

Personal details
- Born: 1870
- Died: 4 December 1939 (aged 68–69)
- Political party: Independent

Patrick T. Keohane (1870 – 4 December 1939) was an Irish politician. He was an independent member of Seanad Éireann from 1938 to 1939. He was nominated by the Taoiseach to the 2nd Seanad on 10 May 1938 to fill the vacancy caused by the election of Douglas Hyde as President of Ireland. He was again nominated to the 3rd Seanad in August 1938. He died in office in 1939 and Laurence O'Neill was nominated to fill the vacancy.
