= Donal O'Sullivan (politician) =

Irish academic and politician (1893–1973)

Senator
- In office 8 September 1943 – 18 August 1944
- Constituency: Cultural and Educational Panel

Personal details
- Born: 24 December 1893 Liverpool, England
- Died: 15 April 1973 (aged 79) Dublin, Ireland
- Party: Independent
- Spouse: Jean Horgan (m. 1925)

Donal Joseph O'Sullivan (24 December 1893 – 15 April 1973) was an Irish academic, folk-music historian and politician. He was an independent member of Seanad Éireann from 1943 to 1944. He was elected to the 4th Seanad in 1943 by the Cultural and Educational Panel. He lost his seat at the 1944 Seanad election. He was also a Clerk of the Seanad from 1922 to 1936.
