= Thomas Delany =

Irish politician (1868–1939

Senator
- In office 7 September 1938 – 9 July 1939
- Constituency: Cultural and Educational Panel

Personal details
- Born: 1868
- Died: 9 July 1939 (aged 70–71)
- Party: Independent

Thomas William Delany (1868 – 9 July 1939) was an Irish politician and solicitor. He was an independent member of Seanad Éireann from 1938 to 1939. He was elected to the 3rd Seanad in August 1938 by the Cultural and Educational Panel. He died in office in 1939. Thomas J. O'Connell was elected on 22 January 1941 to fill the vacancy.
