= Denis Healy (Irish politician) =

Irish politician

Senator
- In office 7 September 1938 – 21 April 1948
- Constituency: Administrative Panel

Senator
- In office 12 December 1934 – 29 May 1936

Personal details
- Political party: Fianna Fáil

Denis Healy was an Irish politician. He was a Fianna Fáil member of the Seanad Éireann from 1934 to 1936, and 1938 to 1948. He was elected to the Free State Seanad in 1934 for 9 years and served until it was abolished in 1936. He was elected to the 3rd Seanad in 1938 on the Administrative Panel and was re-elected at the 1943 and 1944 elections.
