= Bell of Ballinabeck =

Medieval Irish church handbell

The Bell of Ballinabeck or Terryhoogan hand-bell (Irish Clog Bán "white bell" or Clog Beannaithe "blessed bell") is a medieval Irish church handbell made in the 10th century and unearthed about 1725 in the Relicarn graveyard, Ballynabeck, in the townland of Terryhoogan, north of Poyntzpass, County Armagh. Antiquarian George Petrie called it the Bell of Armagh (a name also given to Saint Patrick's Bell). The Bell of Ballinabeck has an inscription Oroit ar Chumascach m[ac] Allello, "pray for Cumascach son of Ailill". This may refer to Cumascach, an official at Armagh monastery (at what is now St Patrick's Church of Ireland Cathedral), whose father Ailill is recorded in the Annals of Ulster as having died in AD 908.

After its discovery, the bell was in the custody of the Hennons, a Catholic peasant family, and rung at Catholic funerals until the 1830s. It was given to James Saurin, the Anglican rector of Seagoe, who assisted Bernard Hennon when in legal trouble. Saurin gave it to Henry Dawson, who bequeathed it to the Royal Irish Academy, whose antiquities became part of the National Museum of Ireland collection. A replica of the bell made in 1939 is used by the Cathaoirleach of Seanad Éireann.

== Sources ==
- Bourke, Cormac (1980). "Early Irish hand-bells". The Journal of the Royal Society of Antiquaries of Ireland. 110: 52–66. ISSN 0035-9106. JSTOR 25508775.
- Ross Chapman The Clog Ban or The Bell of Ballinabeck Poyntzpass and District Local History Society
- G. R. Chapman "The Clog Ban" (11 August 1883) Portadown Lurgan News — reprinted in Journal of the Craigavon Historical Society (1970) vol. 1 no. 2
- Milligan, Seaton F. (1903). "Ancient Ecclesiastical Bells in Ulster". The Journal of the Royal Society of Antiquaries of Ireland. 33 (1): 46–57. ISSN 0035-9106. JSTOR 25507271.
