= Medieval c. 400—c. 1600 =

Medieval c. 400—c. 1600: Art and Architecture of Ireland
- Front cover
- Author: Rachel Moss
- Language: English
- Series: Art and Architecture of Ireland
- Genre: archaeology, Art history
- Published: 31 October 2014
- Publication place: England and Ireland
- Pages: 576
- ISBN: 978-0-3001-7919-4

Medieval c. 400—c. 1600: Art and architecture of Ireland is a 2014 survey book partly written, compiled and edited by the Irish art historian Rachel Moss. It consists of more than 300 contributions from a broad range of Irish archaeologists and art historians on subjects such as Abbeys, round towers and individual chapels such as the 12th-century Gallarus Oratory and Cormac's Chapel begun in 1112 AD. Later chapters cover high crosses, manuscript illumination, and various types of insular metalwork such as brooches, insular croziers, Crucifixion plaques, bell and house-shaped shrines.

The book was commissioned by the Royal Irish Academy and University College Dublin as the first of the five-volume Art and architecture of Ireland series, under the general editorship of the art historian Andrew Carpenter. The books were published by the UK branch of Yale University Press.

The books was very well received, and praised for comprehensiveness, breadth of scholarship and its many high-quality reproductions. According to worldcat, the book is "an unrivaled account of all aspects of the rich and varied visual culture of Ireland in the Middle Ages. Based on decades of original research, the book contains over three hundred lively and informative essays and is magnificently illustrated."

== Chapters ==
1. Introduction, pp. 1–8
2. Influences and Impacts, 9-38
3. Movements, Motifs and Meanings, 39–81
4. Materials and Methods, 83–120
5. Monuments of Christianity, 121–223
6. Art of Worship and Devotion, 225–327
7. Settlement and Society, 329–393
8. Art and Identity, 395–474
9. Patrons and Practitioners, 475-510

== Sources ==
- Harbison, Peter. "Book Review: Medieval c. 400-C. 1600 Volume I". Irish Arts Review , volume 31, nr 4, Winter 2014
- Mulcahy, John. "Art and Architecture of Ireland". Irish Arts Review, Winter 2014, volume 31, issue 4. JSTOR 24365636
