= Dominick MacCabe =

Irish politician

Senator
- In office 7 September 1938 – 21 April 1948
- Constituency: Agricultural Panel

Personal details
- Party: Independent

Dominick MacCabe was an Irish politician. He was an independent member of Seanad Éireann from 1938 to 1948. He was first elected to the 3rd Seanad in 1938 by the Agricultural Panel. He was-elected at the 1943 and 1944 Seanad elections but lost his seat at the 1948 Seanad election.
