= Gallarus Oratory =

Coordinates: 52°10′21″N 10°20′58″W

- Séipéilín Ghallarais
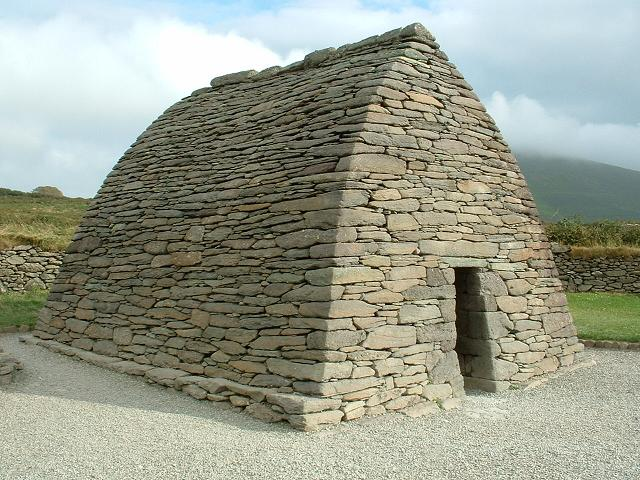

- Location: Dingle Peninsula, County Kerry
- Country: Ireland
- Denomination: Pre-Reformation Catholic

Specifications
- Materials: Old Red Sandstone

Administration
- Archdiocese: Cashel
- Diocese: Ardfert and Aghadoe

National monument of Ireland
- Official name: Gallarus Oratory
- Reference no.: 66

The Gallarus Oratory (Irish: Séipéilín Ghallarais) is an oratory on the Dingle Peninsula, County Kerry, Ireland. It has been presented variously as an early-Christian stone church by antiquary Charles Smith, in 1756; a 12th-century Romanesque church by archaeologist Peter Harbison in 1970; a shelter for pilgrims by the same in 1994. The local tradition prevalent at the time of Charles Smith attributed it to one Griffith More, being a funerary chapel built by him or his family at their burial place.

The oratory overlooks the harbour at Ard na Caithne (formerly also called Smerwick) on the Dingle Peninsula. Saints road (Cosán na Naomh), an old pilgrimage road less than 300 metres away, leads to the summit of Mount Brandon, which can be seen in the background of the oratory.

== Name ==
There exist several interpretations as to the origin and meaning of the placename Gallarus. Archaeologist Peter Harbison ventures the meaning to be something like 'the house or shelter for foreigner(s)' (Gall Aras), the said foreigners being possibly "these pilgrims that have come from outside the Peninsula."

However, according to lexicologist Pádraig Ó Siochfhradha (aka An Seabhac), the name does not refer to a foreign settlement but to a rocky headland (Gall-iorrus).

== Discovery ==
As the oratory is the only intact specimen of its type, it has attracted considerable attention, starting from antiquarians in the mid-18th century. The first account we have of the oratory is Charles Smith's description of 1756 in The Antient and Present State of the County of Kerry (Dublin), p. 191.

== Architecture ==
=== Masonry ===
The oratory is built of large cut stones from the Dingle Beds of the Upper Silurian Old Red Sandstone. Charles Smith, who discovered the edifice in 1756, described the stone as "a brown free-stone, brought from the cliffs of the sea shore, which cuts readily and is very durable."

The stones are cut on every side and end so as to fit perfectly together and slope slightly down to help rain run off the structure. They exhibit smoothly finished outside facings that follow the slant of the wall.

The edifice is usually thought to be of dry-stone walling – built without mortar as a structural medium, but there is evidence that even if mortar "was never visible in the wall facings it was used as a structural medium for the interior of the wall at least." A thin layer of lime mortar is used to bond the stones together and to fill in small hollows in the inner faces.

=== Morphology ===
The oratory’s shape has been compared to that of an upturned boat because of its sloping side walls. The edifice uses corbel vaulting. The stones are positioned on each course with their edges projecting inward by a small increment as the walls rise. Besides, they are laid at a slight angle, lower on the outside than on the inside, thus allowing rainwater to run off. Both techniques can still be seen in the modern agricultural clocháns of the Dingle peninsula.

The edifice has two side walls and two end walls, sloping and converging at the top, each of one piece, playing a dual role as load-bearing wall and corbelled half-vault. The walls are 4 feet (1.20m) thick at the lowest point of the building. Some slight sagging has occurred across the length of the northern roof slope. The interior room is approximately 4.8 metres (16 ft) by 3 metres (10 ft), a size that befits more an oratory or a small chapel than a church. It is dimly lit, with only a tiny round-headed window in the east wall, opposite the entrance door. The window splays more widely towards the inside of the wall. The doorway is 1.67 m (5.5 ft) high. It has a flat lintel. On the inside over the lintel, two holed stones project out from the wall, possibly for the attachment of a wooden door.

== Interpretations as to dates and uses ==
Antiquarian Charles Smith is the originator of the claim that the building is an early Irish stone church although no historical information is available prior to 1756 regarding its use.

In 1970, archaeologist Peter Harbison argued that the oratory might have been built as late as the 12th century for a number of reasons, mainly because the east window has a rounded top made of two carved stones (not a true arch).

Harbison produced some evidence pointing to a later date and a different use: a letter by English traveller Richard Pococke who visited the oratory in 1758, two years after it was discovered by Charles Smith: "Near this building they show a grave with a head at the cross of it and call it the tomb of the Giant; the tradition is that Griffith More was buried there, & as they call'd [it] a chapel, so probably it was built by him or his family at their burial place."

In 1994 and 1995, Harbison gave up the hypothesis of a 12th-century church and claimed that the placename Gallarus meant 'the house or shelter of foreigner(s)' (Gall Aras), the said "foreigner(s)" being pilgrims from outside the peninsula. However, this does not accord with lexicologist Pádraig Ó Siochfhradha's translation of the name as "rocky headland" (Gall-iorrus).

== Archaeological evidence ==
Minor trial cuttings carried out at Gallarus in November 1970 yielded no finds or evidence of features or activity which might shed light on the period of construction and use of the oratory.

== Gallery ==
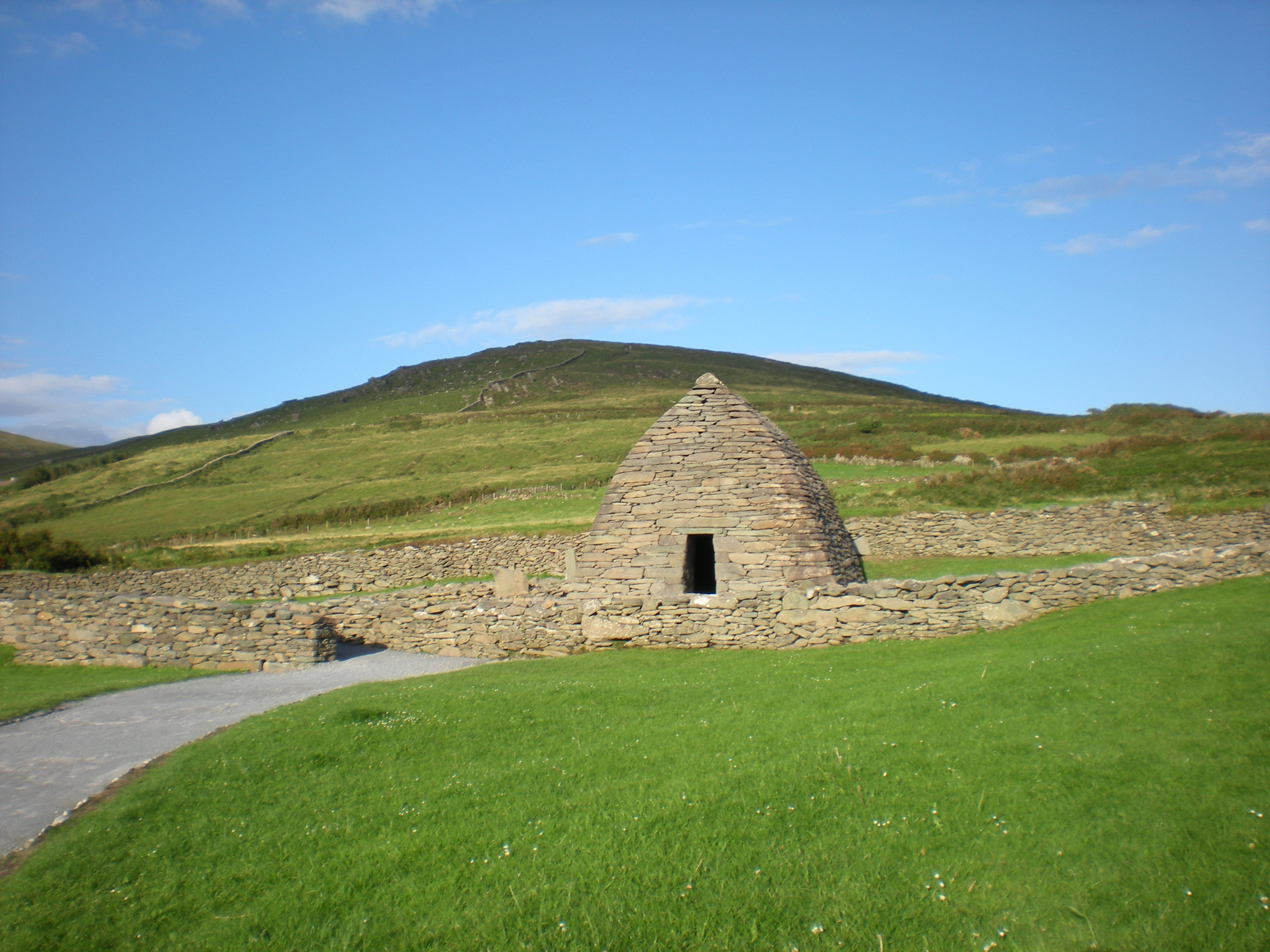
Full view

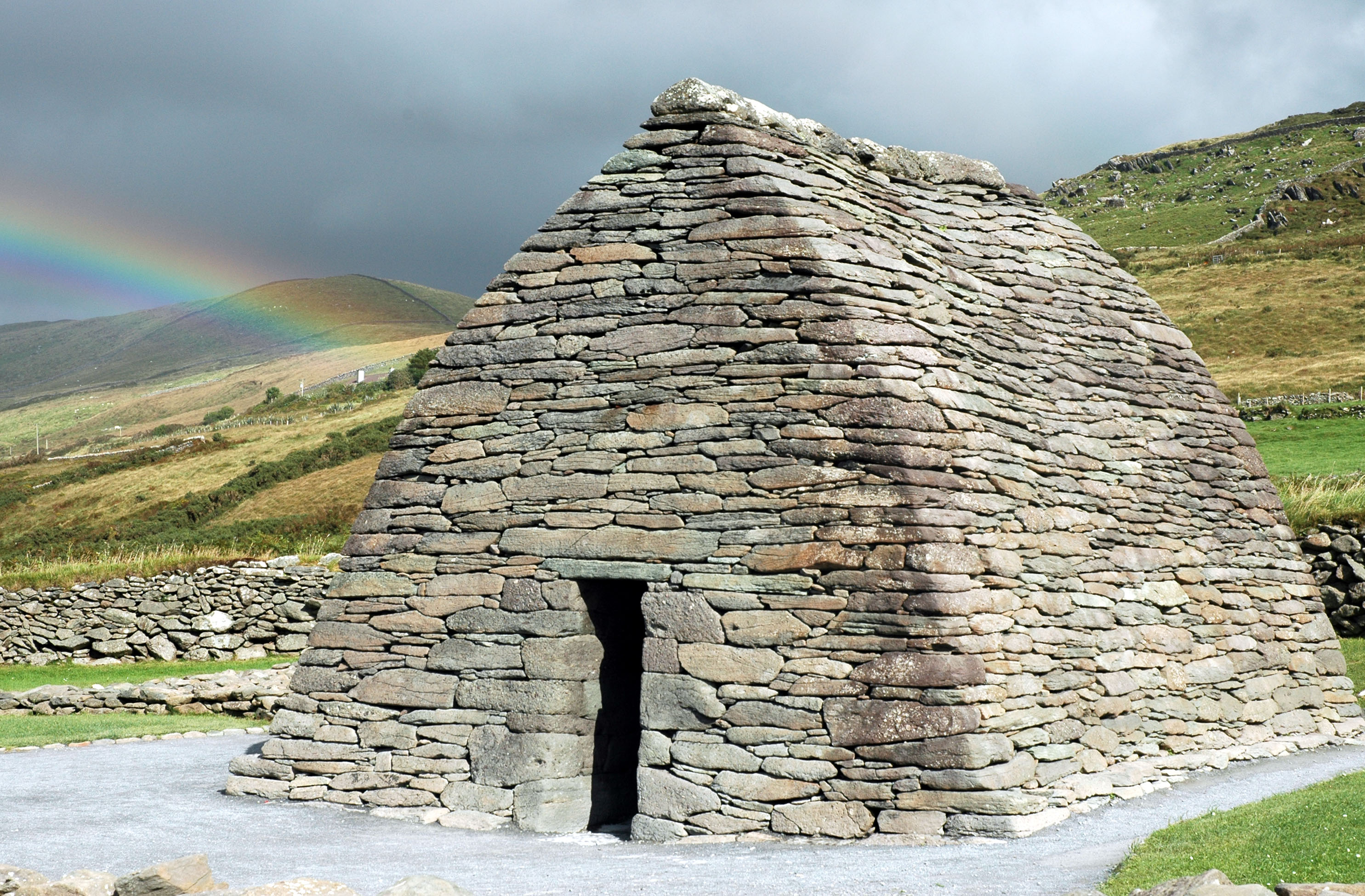
Three-quarter view

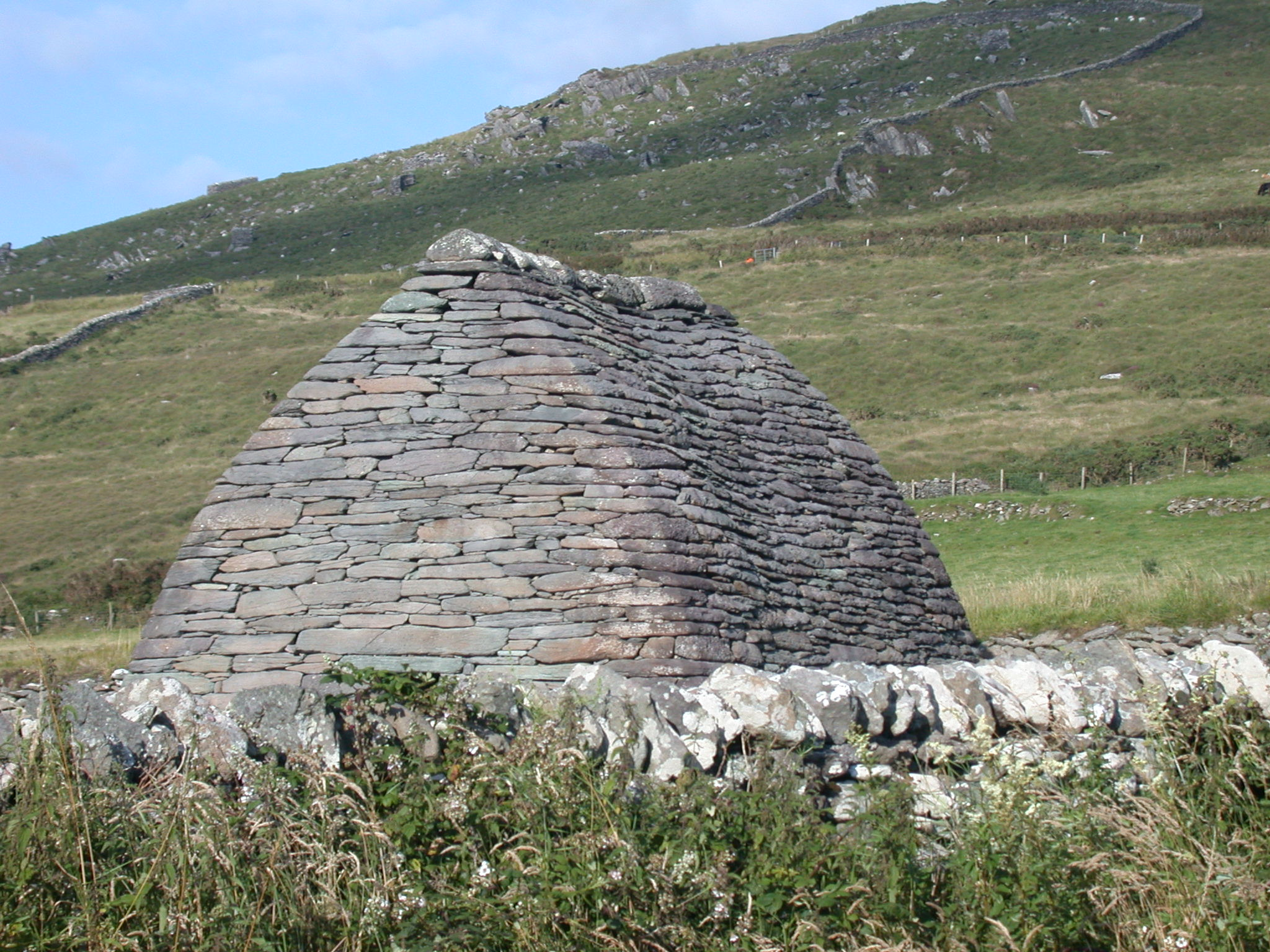
Roof with sag

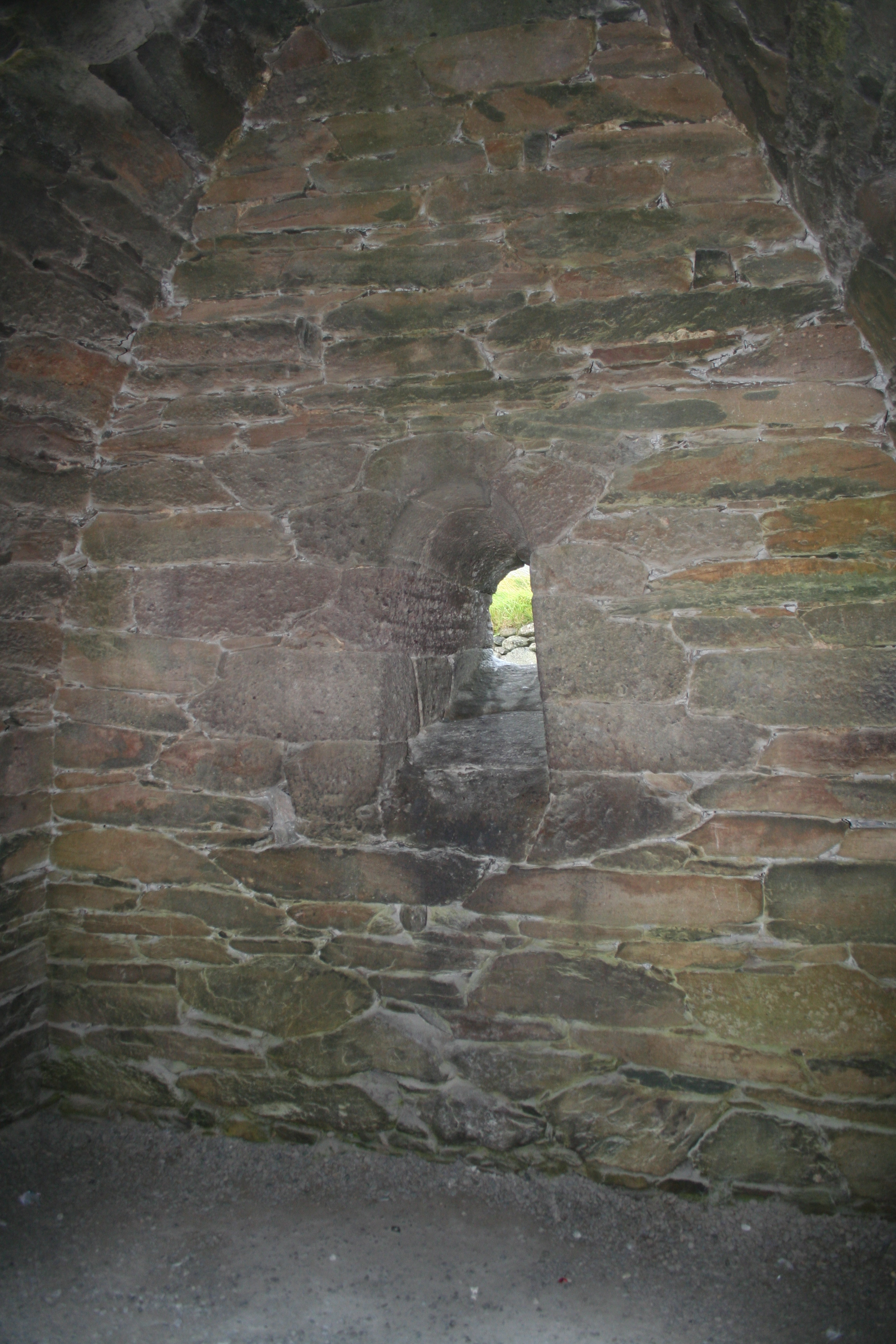
The indoor window

== Sources ==
- Moss, Rachel. Medieval c. 400—c. 1600, "Art and Architecture of Ireland" series. CT: Yale University Press, 2014. ISBN 978-03-001-7919-4
- O'Sullivan, Aidan (September 1998). Appreciation and History of Art. Gill & Macmillan Ltd. ISBN 0-7171-1666-2.
