= Robert Rowlette =

Irish politician (1873–1944)

Senator
- In office 27 April 1938 – 18 August 1944
- Constituency: Dublin University

Teachta Dála
- In office October 1933 – July 1937
- Constituency: Dublin University

Personal details
- Born: 16 October 1873 Carncash, County Sligo, Ireland
- Died: 13 October 1944 (aged 70) Dublin, Ireland
- Party: Independent
- Spouse: Gladys Camper Day
- Children: 1
- Education: Trinity College Dublin

Military service
- Branch/service: British Army
- Rank: Lieutenant colonel
- Unit: Royal Army Medical Corps
- Battles/wars: World War I

Robert James Rowlette (16 October 1873 – 13 October 1944) was an Irish medical doctor and an independent politician. He was later a member of Seanad Éireann.

== Early life ==
He was born on 16 October 1873 at Carncash, County Sligo, the second son of Matthew Rowlett, a farmer, and Kezia Rowlett (née Hunter). His own name always appears as 'Rowlette'. Rowlette attended Sligo Grammar School, and entered Trinity College Dublin (TCD) in 1891, graduating in 1895 as a senior moderator in ethics and logic. In 1896–97, he was president of the University Philosophical Society and was vice-president of the College Historical Society whose gold medal for oratory he won in 1899. Also in 1899, he graduated MD, having studied medicine since 1893 in parallel with his arts courses, already receiving his MB and B.Ch. in 1898. Rowlette's varied academic record anticipated a subsequent career in medicine and politics, where he moved between one discipline and the other with apparent ease.

== Career ==
He was, at various times, president of the Royal College of Physicians of Ireland and the Royal Irish Academy of Medicine and the editor of the Journal of the Irish Medical Organisation. As well as holding several hospital appointments (including Mercer's Hospital) and consultancies, he was king's professor of materia medica and pharmacy at TCD, and professor of pharmacology at the Royal College of Surgeons in Ireland.

== Military and sporting activities ==
During World War I he served in the Royal Army Medical Corps, with the rank of Lieutenant colonel on his discharge. He was mentioned in dispatches while serving in France.

His athletic prowess at TCD, particularly in track events, long-distance running, and membership of the Dublin University Harriers, translated into a passionate life interest. He had a long involvement in long-distance athletics, both as a competitor in his younger years and later in the administration of the Irish Amateur Athletics Association and, after 1922, the National Athletic and Cycling Association of Ireland.

He was Honorary Physician to the British Olympic team at the 1920 Summer Olympics in Antwerp, and to the Irish teams at the 1924 Summer Olympics in Paris and the 1928 Summer Olympics in Amsterdam, the first two occasions on which an independent Irish team competed.

== Political career ==
Rowlette was elected unopposed to the 8th Dáil as a Teachta Dála (TD) for the Dublin University constituency at a by-election on 13 October 1933, following the death of sitting TD James Craig. He was the first TD elected to the Dáil without having to take the Oath of Allegiance to the crown, abolished with effect from the previous May.

In 1938, the university constituencies were transferred to Seanad Éireann, and Rowlette was then elected for three successive terms, to the 2nd, 3rd and 4th Seanads. He failed to gain re-election to the Seanad in 1944, finishing as the runner-up by a margin of 5 votes out of a total valid poll of 2,297.

== Later life and death ==
He was married to Gladys Camper Day, and they had one son. During World War II, he took charge of air-raid casualty preparations in a liaison scheme between Mercer's and St Bricin's military hospital. He died on 13 October 1944 at his home, 55 Fitzwilliam Square, Dublin. He was buried in Enniskerry cemetery, County Wicklow. His first cousin once removed was Dr Mary Henry, who also represented Dublin University in the Seanad, from 1993 to 2007.

Dáil	Election	Deputy (Party)	Deputy (Party)	Deputy (Party)	Deputy (Party)
1st	1918	Arthur Samuels (U)	Robert Woods (Ind U)	2 seats under 1918 Act	
1st	1919 by-election	William Jellett (U)	Robert Woods (Ind U)	2 seats under 1918 Act	
2nd	1921	Ernest Alton (Ind U)	James Craig (Ind U)	William Thrift (Ind U)	Gerald Fitzgibbon (Ind U)
3rd	1922	Ernest Alton (Ind.)	James Craig (Ind.)	William Thrift (Ind.)	Gerald Fitzgibbon (Ind.)
4th	1923	Ernest Alton (Ind.)	James Craig (Ind.)	William Thrift (Ind.)	3 seats from 1923
5th	1927 (Jun)	Ernest Alton (Ind.)	James Craig (Ind.)	William Thrift (Ind.)	3 seats from 1923
6th	1927 (Sep)	Ernest Alton (Ind.)	James Craig (Ind.)	William Thrift (Ind.)	3 seats from 1923
7th	1932	Ernest Alton (Ind.)	James Craig (Ind.)	William Thrift (Ind.)	3 seats from 1923
8th	1933	Ernest Alton (Ind.)	James Craig (Ind.)	William Thrift (Ind.)	3 seats from 1923
8th	1933 by-election	Ernest Alton (Ind.)	Robert Rowlette (Ind.)	William Thrift (Ind.)	3 seats from 1923
