= Shrine of St. Patrick's Bell =

12th-century Irish bell shrine

St. Patrick's Bell Shrine
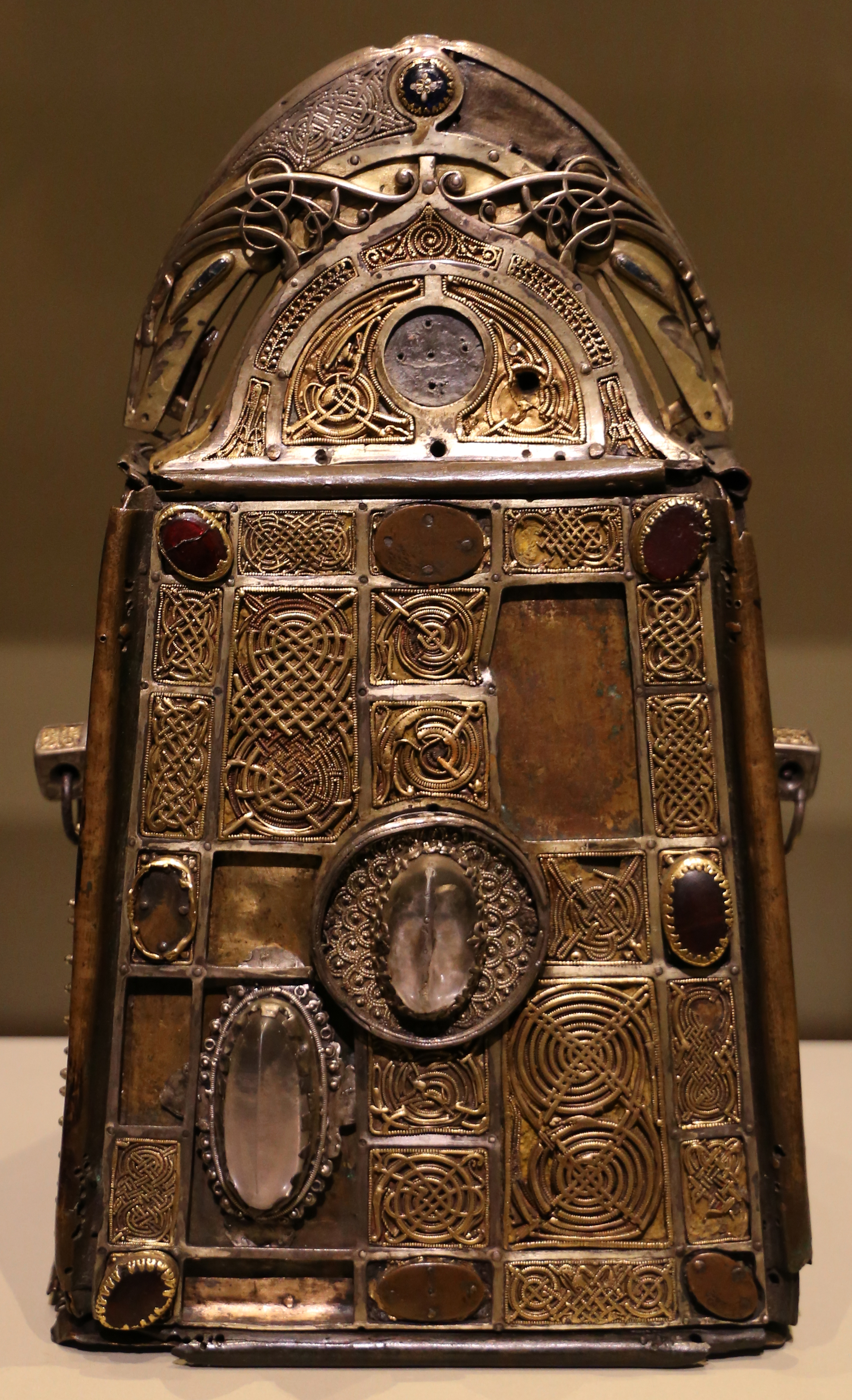
- Material: Bell: Iron, bronze Shrine: bronze, silver, gold, glass, rock crystal
- Size: Bell: Height: 20 cm (7.9 in); Shrine: height: 23 cm (9.1 in)
- Created: Bell: 800-900; Shrine: c. 1094-1105
- Period/culture: Early Medieval, Insular, Romanesque
- Present location: National Museum of Ireland, Kildare Street, Dublin
- Identification: Shrine: NMI, R4011

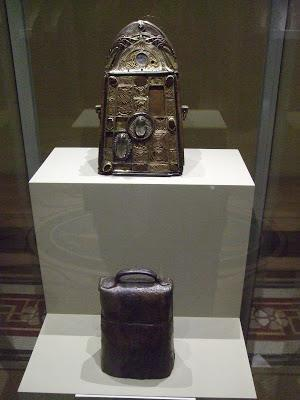
The bell and shrine on display

The Shrine of St. Patrick's Bell is a bell shrine reliquary dated to c. 1094–1105. It was built in County Armagh, Ireland, to contain a c. 500 iron hand-bell which survives and is traditionally associated with the Irish patron saint Saint Patrick (d. 5th-century). It contains inscriptions recording that it was commissioned after 1091 by the Uí Néill High King Domnall Ua Lochlainn and completed c. 1105 by the metalworker Cú Dúilig, about whom nothing is known. Both objects are historically significant, with the bell being one of the few Irish very-early medieval artifacts with a continuous provenance lasting from around the 8th century to the present, and the shrine is a highpoint of Irish metalwork from the late Insular and early Romanesque periods.

The bell is made from iron lined with bronze, while its slightly larger shrine is made from bronze, silver and gold and is trapezoidal and sloping in shape, mimicking the form of the bell it was designed to enclose. The shrine's front is minutely decorated having once held thirty gilded filigree panels organised in complex arrays, although some are now lost. Its short sides contain pairs of openwork panels showing elongated beasts intertwined with ribbon-bodied snakes. The bell was enshrined during a period when many older reliquaries were being preserved or protected with metal encasings; see also Cumdachs (metal containers for Early Medieval Irish manuscripts).

Both objects were kept together for centuries by their hereditary keepers until acquired by the Irish state in the late 19th century. Today both are on permanent display in the Treasury room of the archaeology branch of the National Museum of Ireland (NMI) in Dublin. An early 20th-century copy is in the Metropolitan Museum of Art in New York.

== Providence ==
Both the bell and shrine were held for centuries by their hereditary keepers the Ó Maellchallain family. The objects had been for a period buried in their garden until the early 19th century, when the last member of the family, a cleric, asked Adam McLean, a merchant from Belfast, to dig them up. They soon after passed into the possession of antiquarians. The bell and shrine were eventually acquired by the Royal Irish Academy for £500, and passed into the collection of the National Museum of Ireland in the late 19th century.

== Description ==
=== Bell ===
Bronze hand-bells (Irish: clog) are one of the most numerous surviving forms of early medieval relics in Ireland, and were typically passed between successive generations of abbots and clerics. St. Patrick's bell is one of the most well-known and one of the few Irish objects whose provenance can be traced back 1400 years; it dates from c. 500, although its tongue may be a later addition. Earlier known as the "Clog-Phadruig", "Clog an Edachta", or the "Bell of Armagh", it is thought to have once belonged to the Irish patron saint Patrick, and to have been buried with him — the Annals of Ulster record that in 552 Colmcille recovered three relics from Patrick's grave. There are presumed to have been either his chalice, manuscript, staff and his bell. Legendarily, an angel asked Columcille to donate the cup to County Down and the bell to Armagh.

The bell is 20 cm (7.9 in) high, weighs 1.7 kg (3.7 lb), and is trapezoidal and sloping in shape. It is formed from two sheets of iron which were hammered into shape and joined with rivets. The bell was coated by dipping the iron onto melted bronze. It has a curved crest which holds a separately cast handle.

An early "Life of Patrick", the bilingual Vita tripartita Sancti Patricii, details several stories mentioning bell-relics associated with Patrick. A number recall his battle on Croagh Patrick and draw influence from the Collectanea where his "anger grew against [the blackbirds]. He strikes his bell, so that the men of Ireland heard its voice, and he flung it at them so its gap out of it and that [bell] is Brigit's Gapling".

=== Shrine ===
Saint's hand bells were sometimes enshrined to give prestige to their owner. They were highly prized in the 10th and 11th centuries, although only some 15 survive. It is probable that the shrines were also used for swearing loyalty or legal oaths and may sometimes have acted as battle standards. St. Patrick's bell was enshrined c. 1100 by the High King of Ireland Domnall Ua Lochlainn (reigned 1094—1121 AD), and the bishop of Armagh. The shrine is made from four trapezoidal plates joined at the corners by tubes, and further secured by a top-cap and a sliding base plate. Its front is split between an upper crest and main body and is decorated by a series of plates containing complex openwork designs and geometric cross-patterns.

==== Crest and front ====
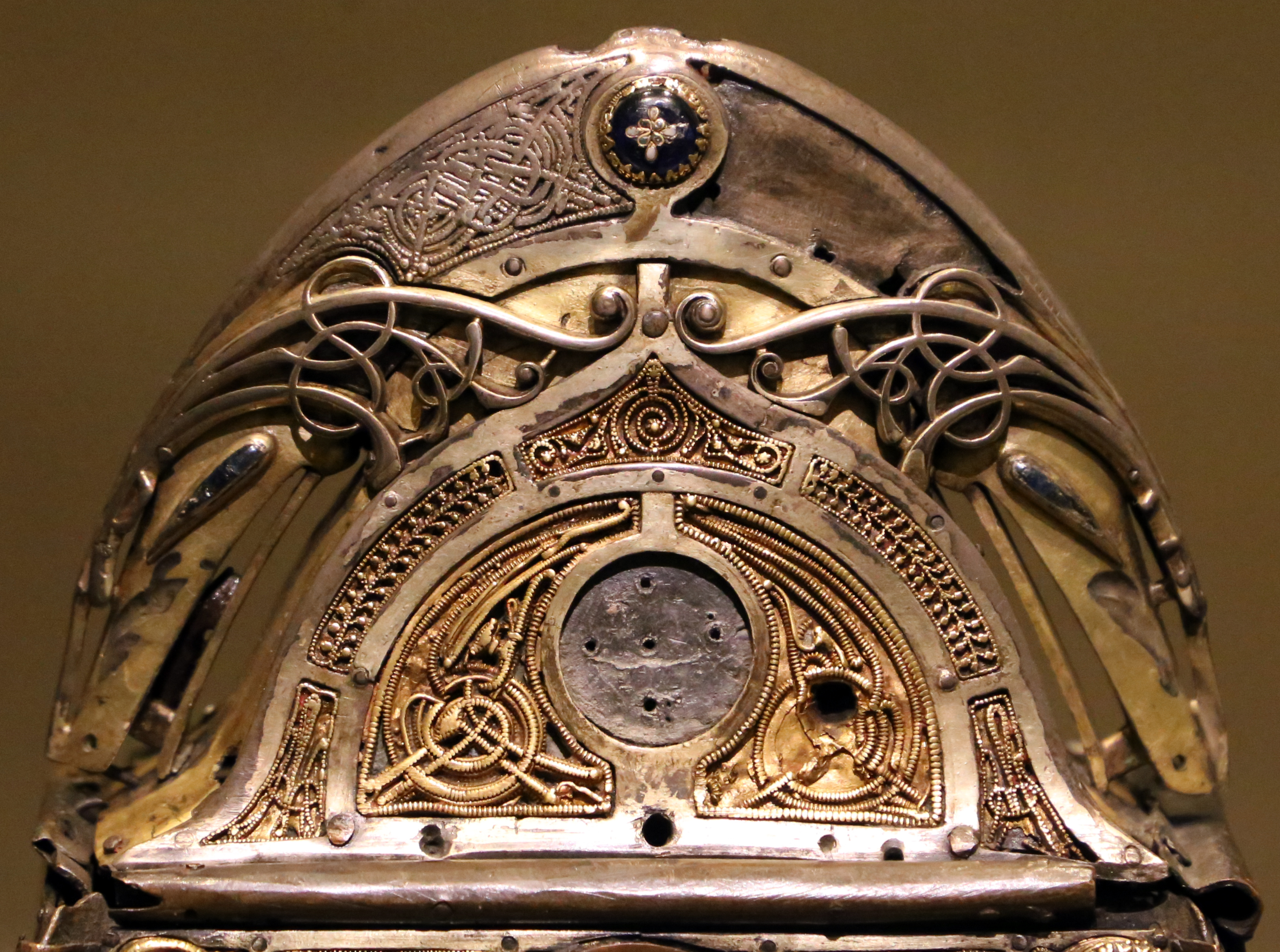
The front crest with gilt bronze cap, confronted birds, a large blue glass boss, and extensive filigree.

The top of the crest is lined with a hollow gilt bronze cap with extended wings terminating in animal heads. Its mid-portion contains the heads of two confronted birds in profile with raised wings. The centre of its main section contains a large blue glass boss (or stud) holding a cloisonné (held in place by strips of wire) insert. The centre of the panel to the right is decorated with zoomorphic interlace, while the centre of the insert to the right is now empty.

The main body is built from a grid of silver gilt panels holding a number of smaller inserts. The larger panels are divided into quadrilaterals set in a cross shape. This section once held thirty panels of gold filigree and zoomorphic interlace, although a number of these have been damaged or lost and are now either replaced with coloured stones or empty. The positioning and intricacy of the individual panels indicate that the shrine was modelled in advance on a flat surface with a compass and T-square, achieving equal ratios and measures of mathematical distance, proportion, volume and line.

==== Sides and reverse ====
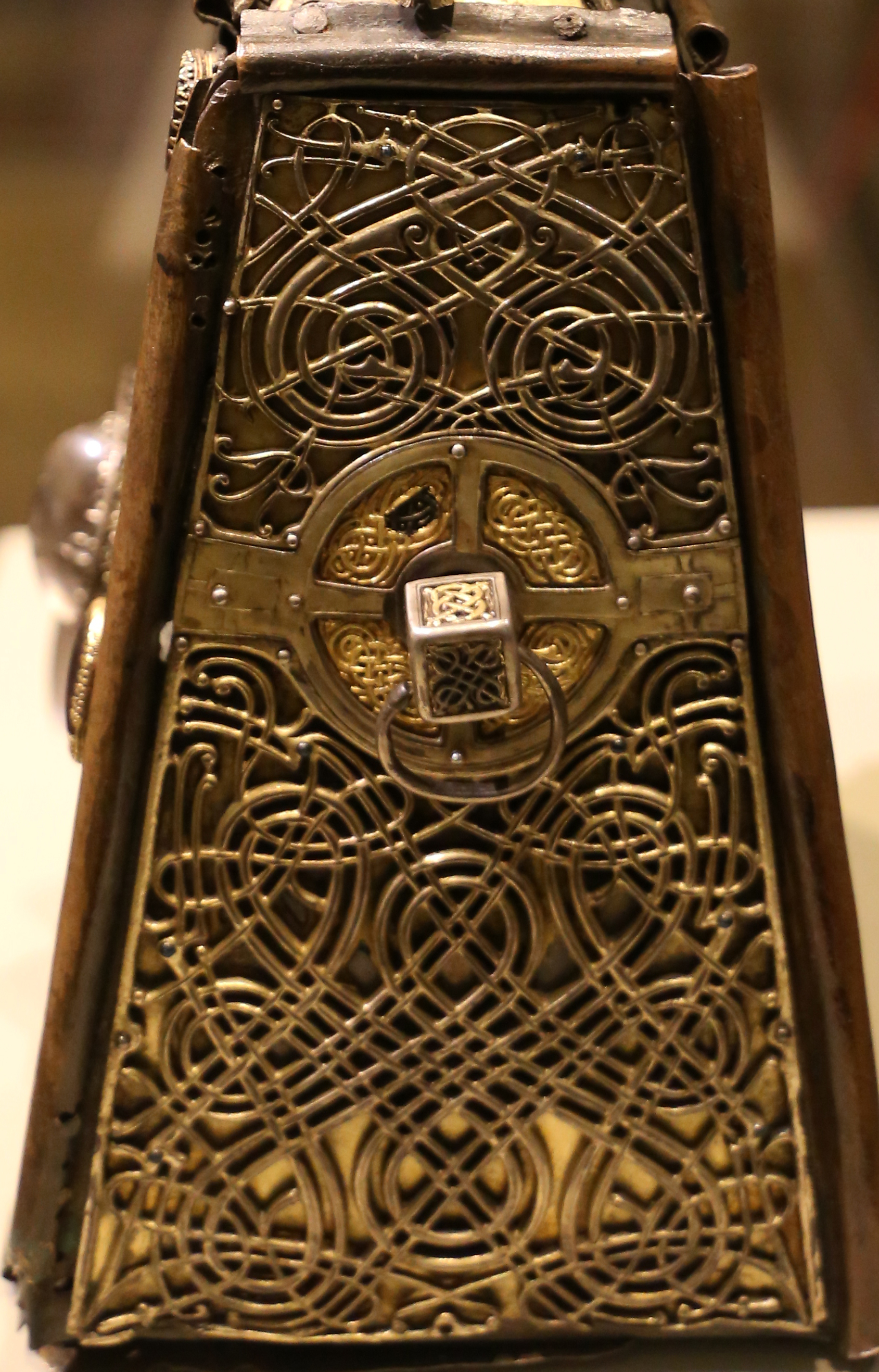
Detail of the left hand side

Both of the shrine's short sides contain a pair of openwork silver and gilt panels filled with interlace and separated vertically by an openwork frame. They each have a perforated cube and rings that were once used to attach carrying chains (lost since the 19th century), while the base plate is loose and could be slid open so as to remove the bell.

The reverse is in the same shape as the front plate but does not contain the bilateral symmetry characteristic of the front and sides and lacks the "circle and cross" patterns prevalent on the front. Its body comprises an openwork silver plate containing diagonal rows of interlocking patterns arranged in patterns and colouring similar to those on the backs of the 11th-century portions of the Soiscél Molaisse and the Cathach. The crest on the back is also decorated but is plainer and in lower relief. The shrine is the only extant bell-relic associated with Patrick, out of the few mentioned in various pre-1200 AD texts and accounts. Two of these now lost shrines were named the "Bernàn" (the gapped bell), and "the Findfaidech" (the sweet-sounding bell, mentioned before 947).

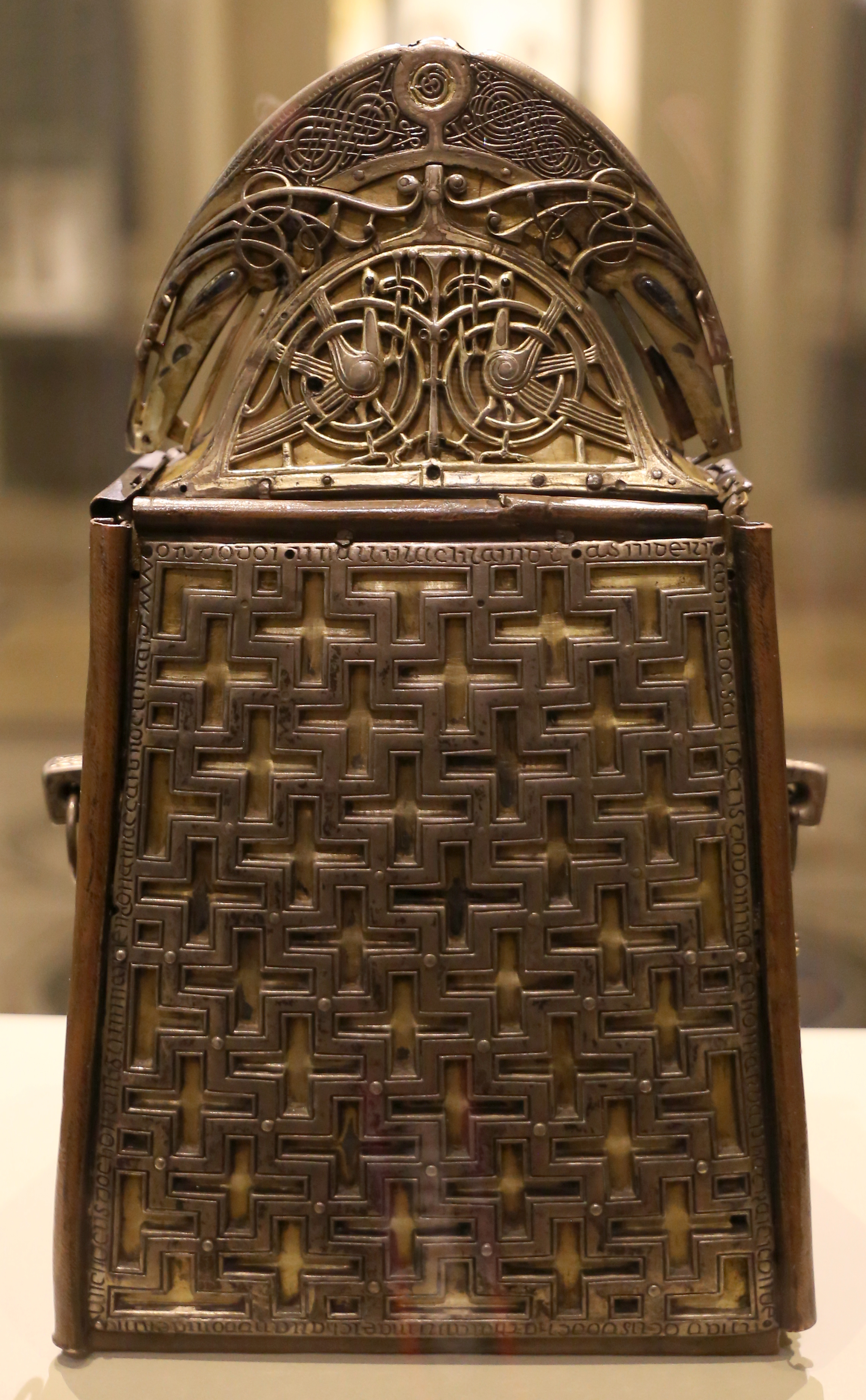
Openwork crosses on the reverse

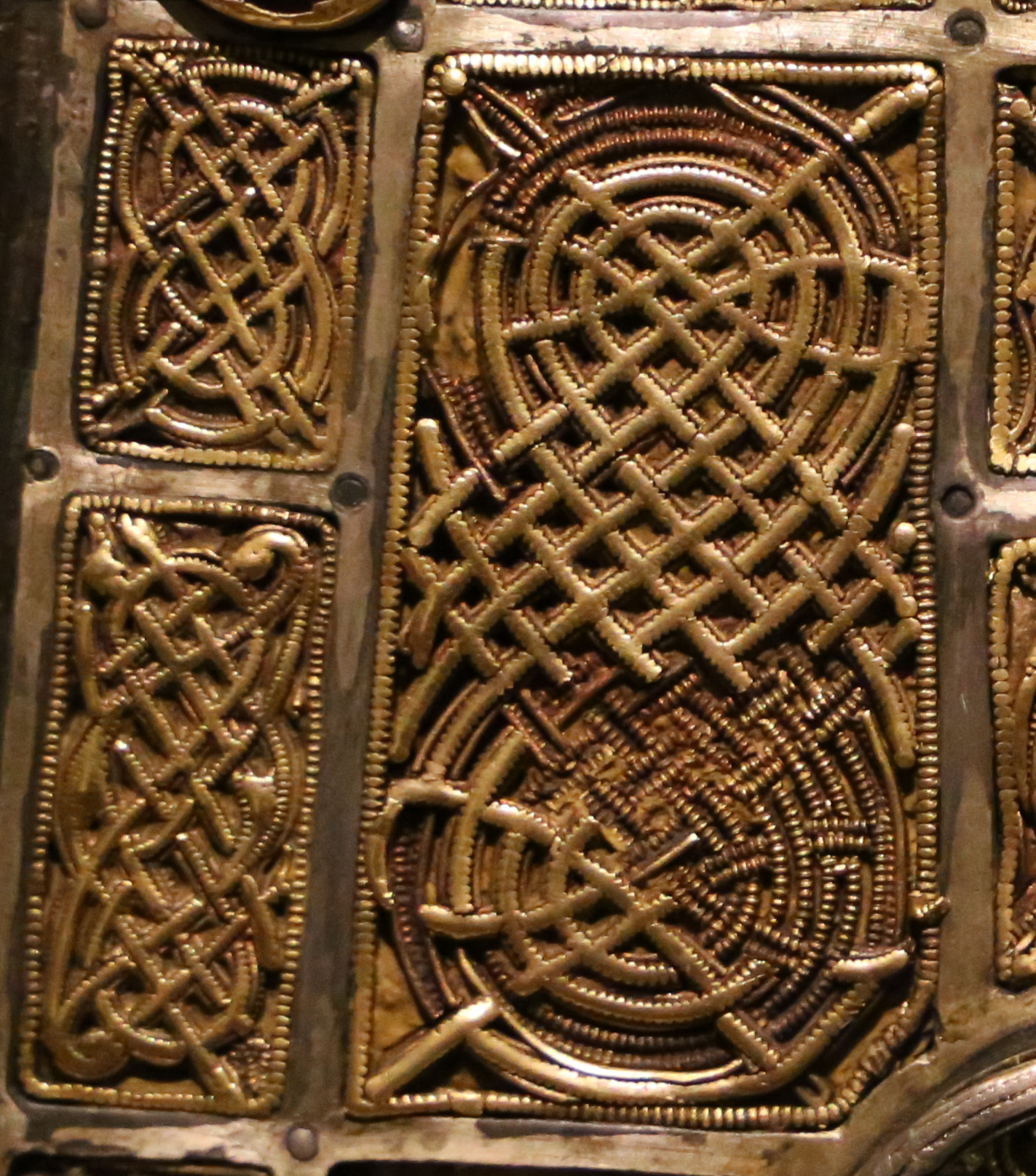
Detail of patterns on the body of the front side

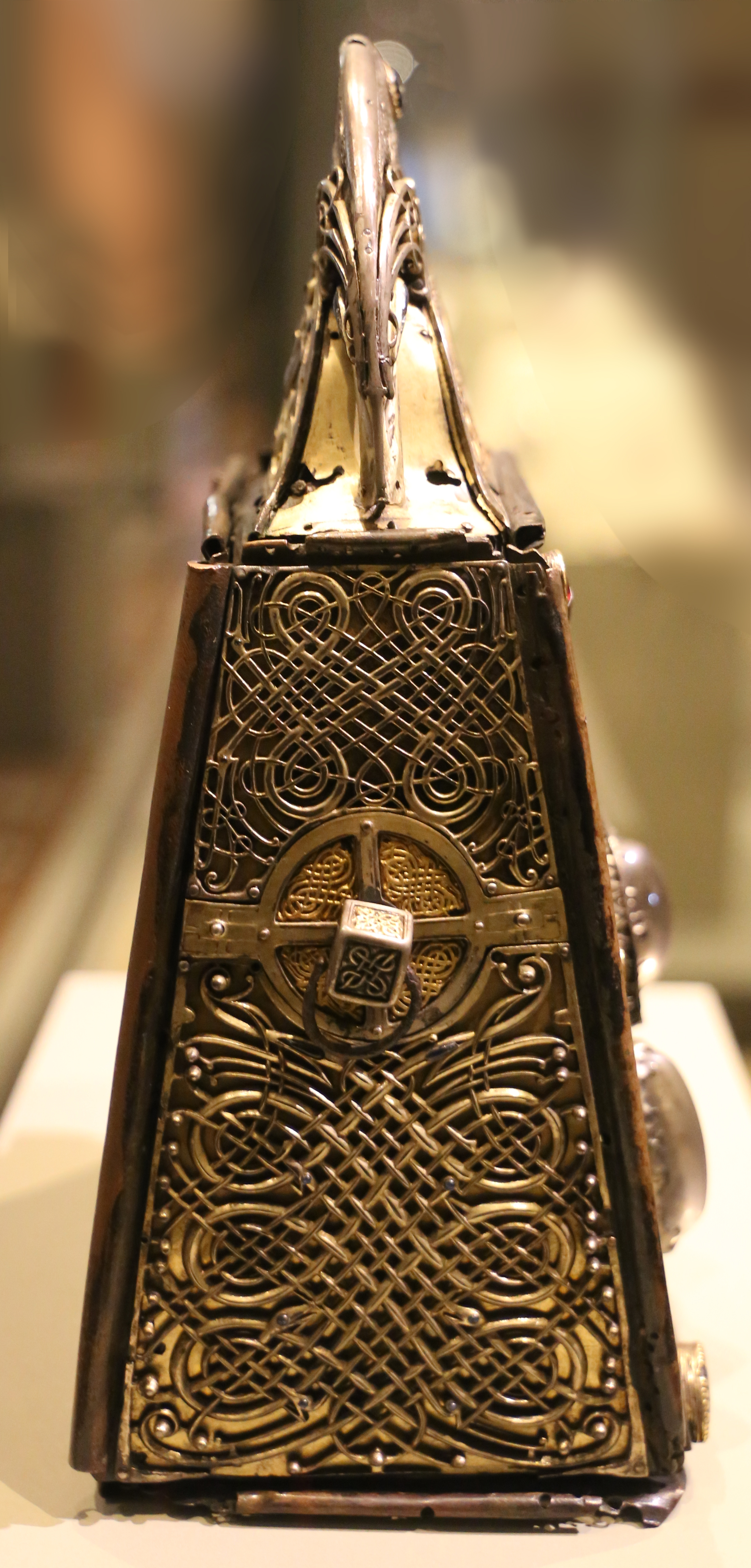
General view of the right hand side

== Inscriptions ==
The shrine's backplate contains inscriptions running continuously around the edge. They are interpreted as recording the names of Ua Lochlainn, who commissioned the work, its keeper Cathalan Ua Maelchallain (Bishop of Armagh from 1091 to 1105), and its craftsman Cú Dúilig and his sons.

The inscriptions read: OR DO DOMNALL U LACHLAIND LASINDERN AD IN CLOCSA / OCUS DO DOMNALL CHOMARBA PHATRAIC ICONDER NAD OCUS DOD CHATHALAN U MAELCHALLAND DO MAER IN CH LUIC / OCUS DO CHONDULIG U INMAINEN CONA MACCAIB ROCUMTAIG ("Pray for Domnall Ua Lochlainn for whom was made this bell, and for Domnall, coarb of Patrick, in whose house (it) was made, and for Cathalan ua M?el Challand, for the keeper of this bell, and for C? D?ilig Ua Inmainen, with his sons, (who) enshrined it").

== Sources ==
- Bourke, Cormac. The Early Medieval Hand-bells of Ireland and Britain. Dublin: Wordwell, 2022. ISBN 978-0-9017-7788-1
- Crawford, Henry. "A Descriptive List of Irish Shrines and Reliquaries. Part I". Journal of the Royal Society of Antiquaries of Ireland, sixth series, volume 13, No. 1, 30 June 1923. JSTOR 25513282
- De Paor, Liam. "The Christian Triump: The Golden Age". In: Treasures of Early Irish Art, 1500 B.C. to 1500 A.D. Archived 6 June 2021 at the Wayback Machine. NY: Metropolitan Museum of Art, 1977. ISBN 978-0-8709-9164-6
- Erskine, Sarah. "Is the Cloc ind Édachta St Patrick's oldest and most important medieval bell-relic?". Journal of the Royal Society of Antiquaries of Ireland, volume 142/143, 2012. JSTOR 24892511
- Lovett, Richard. "Shrine of St. Patrick's Bell - Irish Pictures". Religious Tract Society, 1888
- Moss, Rachel. Medieval c. 400—c. 1600: Art and Architecture of Ireland. London: Yale University Press, 2014. ISBN 978-0-3001-7919-4
- Ó Floinn, Raghnal; Wallace, Patrick. Treasures of the National Museum of Ireland: Irish Antiquities. Dublin: National Museum of Ireland, 2002. ISBN 978-0-7171-2829-7
- Overbey, Karen. Sacral Geographies: Saints, Shrines and Territory in Medieval Ireland. Turnhout: Brepols, 2012. ISBN 978-2-503-52767-3
- Mitchell, Perette. "The Inscriptions on Pre-Norman Irish Reliquaries". Proceedings of the Royal Irish Academy: Archaeology, Culture, History, Literature, volume 96C, no. 1, 1996. JSTOR 25516156
- Reeves, William. "On the Bell of St. Patrick, called the Clog an Edachta". The Transactions of the Royal Irish Academy, volume 27, 1877. JSTOR 30078799
- Stevick, Robert. "St Patrick's Bell Shrine: Form and Layout of the Plates". Journal of the Royal Society of Antiquaries of Ireland volume 138, 2008. JSTOR 27920487
