= Art and Architecture of Ireland (series) =

Art and Architecture of Ireland is a series of five books commissioned the Royal Irish Academy and University College Dublin, under the general editorship of the art historian Andrew Carpenter. The series is published by the UK branch of Yale University Press.

According to the preface of the first volume, Medieval c. 400—c. 1600, the series aims to provide a "comprehensive, authoritative and fully illustrated account of the arts and architecture of Ireland from the Middle Ages to the Late Twentieth century." In total, the books contain contributions from 274 scholarly contributors, 2821 pages of text, and numerous high-resolution images.

== Volumes ==
The series consists of the following volumes:

1. Medieval c. 400—c. 1600. Edited by Rachel Moss, designed by Sophie Sheldrake. 576 pages, all of which are essays. ISBN 978-0-3001-7919-4
2. Painting (1600—1900). Edited by Nicola Figgi, designed by Ian Hunt. Contains 302 biographies up to Jack B. Yeats (1871–1922). 556 pages, of which 300 are biographies. ISBN 978-0-3001-7920-0
3. Sculpture (1600—2000). Edited by Paula Murphy, designed by Fred Birdsall. Contains 248 bios and is more weighted than volume II towards thematic essays. ISBN 978-03001-7921-7
4. Architecture (1600—2000). Edited by Rolf Loeber, Hugh Campbell, Livia Hurley, John Montague and Ellen Rowley, designed by Emily Winter. Mostly essays, with 10 pages of bios. ISBN 978-0-3001-7922-4
5. Twentieth Century. Edited by Catherine Marshall and Peter Murray, designed by Emily Winter. ISBN 978-0-3001-7923-1

== Sources ==
- Harbison, Peter. "Book Review: Medieval c. 400-C. 1600 Volume I". Irish Arts Review , volume 31, nr 4, Winter 2014
- Mulcahy, John. "Art and Architecture of Ireland". Irish Arts Review, Winter 2014, volume 31, issue 4. JSTOR 24365636
