= Rachel Moss (art historian) =

Irish art historian

Dr. Rachel Moss is an Irish art historian and professor specialising in medieval art, with a particular interest in Insular art, medieval Irish Gospel books and monastic history. She is the current head of the Department of the History of Art at Trinity College Dublin, where she became a fellow in 2022. and is a former president of the Royal Society of Antiquaries of Ireland.

Moss has written extensively on Insular art, including on its iconography, materials, methods and political and cultural settings. Her work includes detailed examinations of Irish round towers, high crosses, psalters, Celtic broochs, chalicees and house-shaped and other reliquary shrines, with a close focus on illuminated manuscripts such as the Book of Durrow (c. 700 AD), the Stowe Missal (after 792 AD), and Book of Mulling (late 8th or early 9th century).

== Career ==
Moss has said that her interest in the medieval came from her grandfather, an archaeologist living in County Sligo, who took her on digs when she was a child. She remembered "vividly when I was six and he took me to see a dig. One of the archaeologists put a human jawbone in my hand and told me about how you could tell she was a young woman. Awarded her doctorate in 2009, a post-graduate, she worked on literacy projects in the then deprived Fatima Mansions area of Dublin.

In 2011, she became a fellow of the Society of Antiquaries of London, and in 2013 she was elected president of the Royal Society of Antiquaries of Ireland. She is the current Head of the Department of the History of Art at Trinity College Dublin.

She edited the 2014 survey "Medieval c. 400—c. 1600: Art and Architecture of Ireland", published by Yale University Press as part of their five-volume Art and architecture of Ireland series. Her book was described by the Royal Irish Academy as "an unrivalled account of all aspects of the rich and varied visual culture of Ireland in the Middle Ages. Based on decades of original research, the book contains over three hundred lively and informative essays." Writing for History Ireland, Peter Harbison said that Moss' book "covers a much greater span of time than all the others, and also deals with a much wider range of material. The major attractions are the famous manuscripts and metalwork from the earlier period, but there is a lot more besides—including the recently discovered Faddan More Psalter of c. 800. Stonework is covered extensively from the earlier medieval period: high crosses, round towers and all the church buildings from [the] Gallarus Oratory to Cormac's Chapel."

Moss lives in Dublin and Sligo with her husband Jason Ellis, a sculptor.

== Selected publications ==
=== Books (author) ===
- Irish and Scottish Art, c. 900-1900: Survivals and Revivals (with Heather Pulliam). Edinburgh: Edinburgh University Press, 2024. ISBN 978-1-3995-1738-6
- The Book of Durrow. Dublin Trinity College Library; Thames and Hudson, 2018. ISBN 978-0-5002-9460-4
- An Insular Odyssey: Manuscript Culture in Early Christian Ireland and Beyond. Dublin: Four Courts Press, 2017. ISBN 978-1-8468-2633-7
- Making and Meaning in Insular Art. Dublin: Four Courts Press, 2007. ISBN 978-1-8518-2986-6
- Edward Payne 1906–1991. Dublin: Moss & Glass, 1995. ISBN 978-0-9526-8180-9

=== Books (editor) ===
- "Medieval c. 400—c. 1600", Art and Architecture of Ireland". Yale University Press, 2014. ISBN 978-03-001-7919-4
- Art and Devotion in Late Medieval Ireland. Dublin: Four Courts Press, 2006. ISBN 1-851-82987-3

=== Books (contributed) ===
- "Idolatry, Ignominy, and Iconoclasm: Irish Public Monuments 1540-1700". In Ireland: The Matter of Monuments, Murphy, Paula; Thomas, Colleen M. (eds). Liverpool: Liverpool University Press, 2024. ISBN 978-1-8020-7483-3
- "Art and Visual Literacy in the Early Irish Church". In: Boyle, Elizabeth. A Companion to the Church in Early Ireland, c. 400-c.1150. Dublin: Dublin Institute for Advanced Studies, 2020
- "Resilience, restoration and revival: Insular art in later medieval Ireland". In: Thickpenny, Cynthia (ed). "Peopling Insular Art: Practice, Performance, Perception". Oxford: Oxbow, 2020
- "Irish Parish Churches: 1350-1550". In P. Barnwell (ed.) Places of Worship in the British Isles: 1350-1550, Donington, Shaun Tyas, 2019
- "Material culture: c. 1200-1550". In B. Smith (ed.). Cambridge History of Ireland Volume 1. Cambridge: Cambridge University Press, 2018
- "The Art and the Pigments: A study of four Insular Gospel Books in the Library of Trinity College Dublin". In Panayotova and Ricciardi (eds) *Manuscripts in the Making: Art and Science. London and Turnhout: Brepols, 2017
- "Collective memory and municipal identity in the early modern Irish town". In Dany Sandron (ed.), Le Passé dans la Ville. Paris: Presses de l'université Paris-Sorbonne, 2016

=== Articles (selected) ===
- "Cong Abbey: A Palimpsest in Stone". Proceedings of the Royal Irish Academy, Archaeology, Culture, Literature and History, June 2024
- "Romanesque Chevron Ornament: the language of British, Norman and Irish sculpture in the twelfth century". British Archaeological Reports Limited, 2009
- "Making and Meaning in Insular Art: Proceedings of the Fifth International Conference on Insular Art Held at Trinity College Dublin, 25-28 August 2005". Dublin: Four Courts Press, 2007
