= Bell Shrine of Conall Cael =

9th- or 10th-century Irish bell-shrine

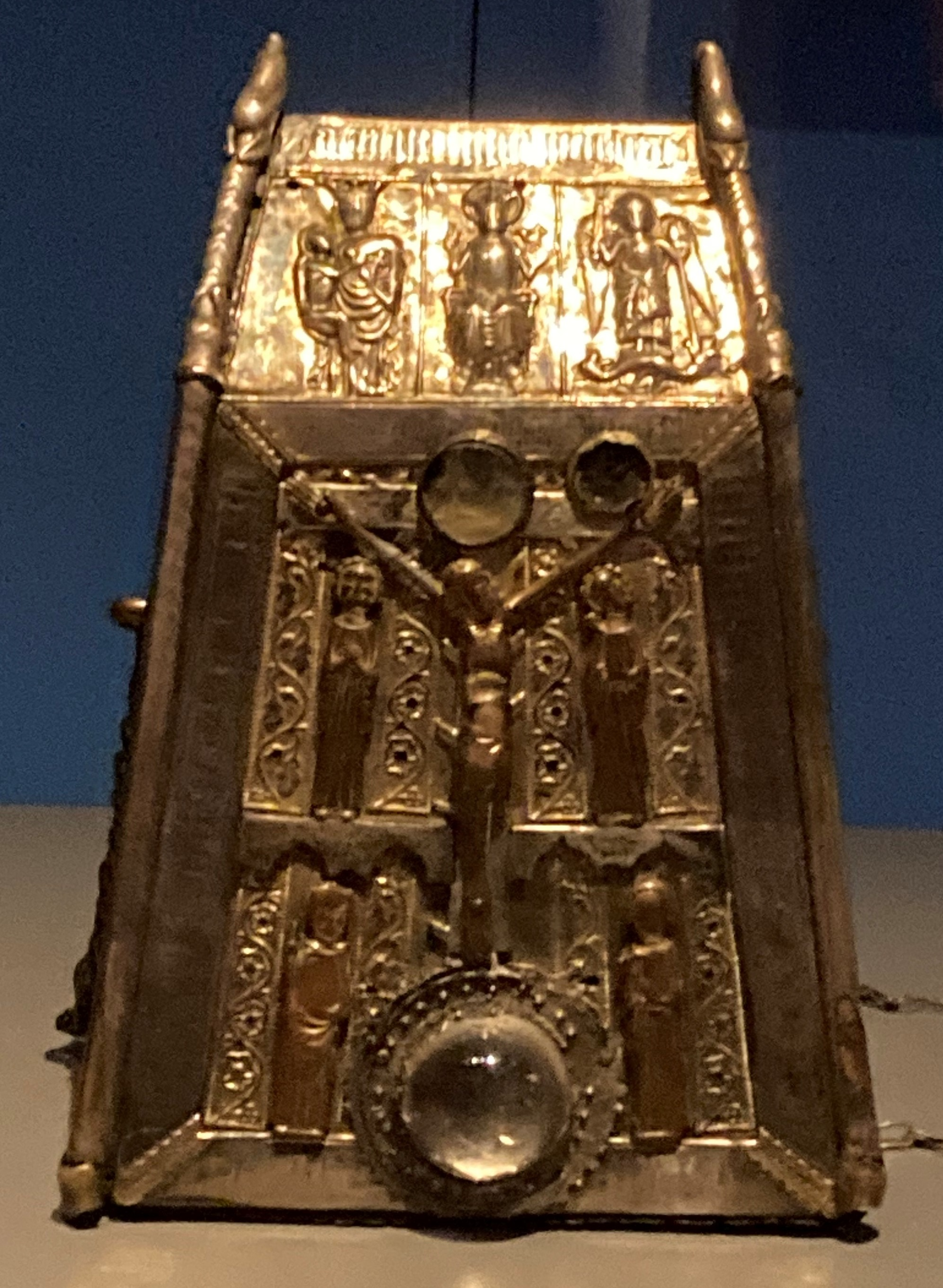
- Front panel of the shrine
- Material: Bronze, silver, gold, rock crystal
- Size: Height: 21.9 cm (8.6 in); Width: 15.5 cm (6.1 in); Depth: 12.7 cm (5.0 in)
- Created: c. 1100; Refurbished in the 16th century
- Period/culture: Early Medieval, Insular
- Discovered: Inishkeel, County Donegal
- Present location: British Museum, London

The Bell Shrine of Conall Cael (or Bell Shrine of Bernán Chonaill) is an early 12th-century bell shrine found on Inishkeel island in County Donegal, Ireland. It was built to contain a 6th-century bell associated with Conall Cael, a relatively obscure early Irish saint associated with Coolaun church, near Cashel in County Tipperary, and was probably created by a secular commissioner to give prestige to the locality.

The shrine was refurbished and added to in the 15th century. It has formed part of British Museum collection since 1889.

== Provenance ==
For many centuries, the shrine was in the possession of its hereditary keepers, the O'Breslin family in Glengesh, County Donegal, who are mentioned in records dating from c. 1609 until c. 1833. A 1835 ordnance survey records that an O'Breslin threw the chain "around his neck, and from it the bell hung down his breast, exhibiting to the enthusiastic pilgrims the glittering gems and the symbol of [a] bloody sacrifice."

It was still in local use by the early 19th century on St. Conall's feast day, when "pilgrims gathered at his well on the island". Both the bell and shrine have been in the collection of the British Museum since 1889.

== Description ==
The shrine is made from bronze, silver, gold and rock crystal. It was heavily refurbished and added to in the 15th century when the majority of the autonomous metal encasing was added. The bell itself was adorned with a decorative mount c. the 10th or 11th centuries.

The upper part of the front shows the seated figure of God the Father with the Virgin and Child and Archangel Michael on to his left and right. The main panel is dominated by a representation of the Crucified Christ, surrounded by four figures in two registers, including the Virgin and Saint John.

It retains its 16th-century metal chain, indicating that it was from then intended to be carried during procession.

== In popular culture ==
The bell shrine was featured in an episode of the BBC's Ireland's Treasures Uncovered, first broadcast on 15 February 2023. Irish archaeologist Dr Niamh Whitfield described the shrine.

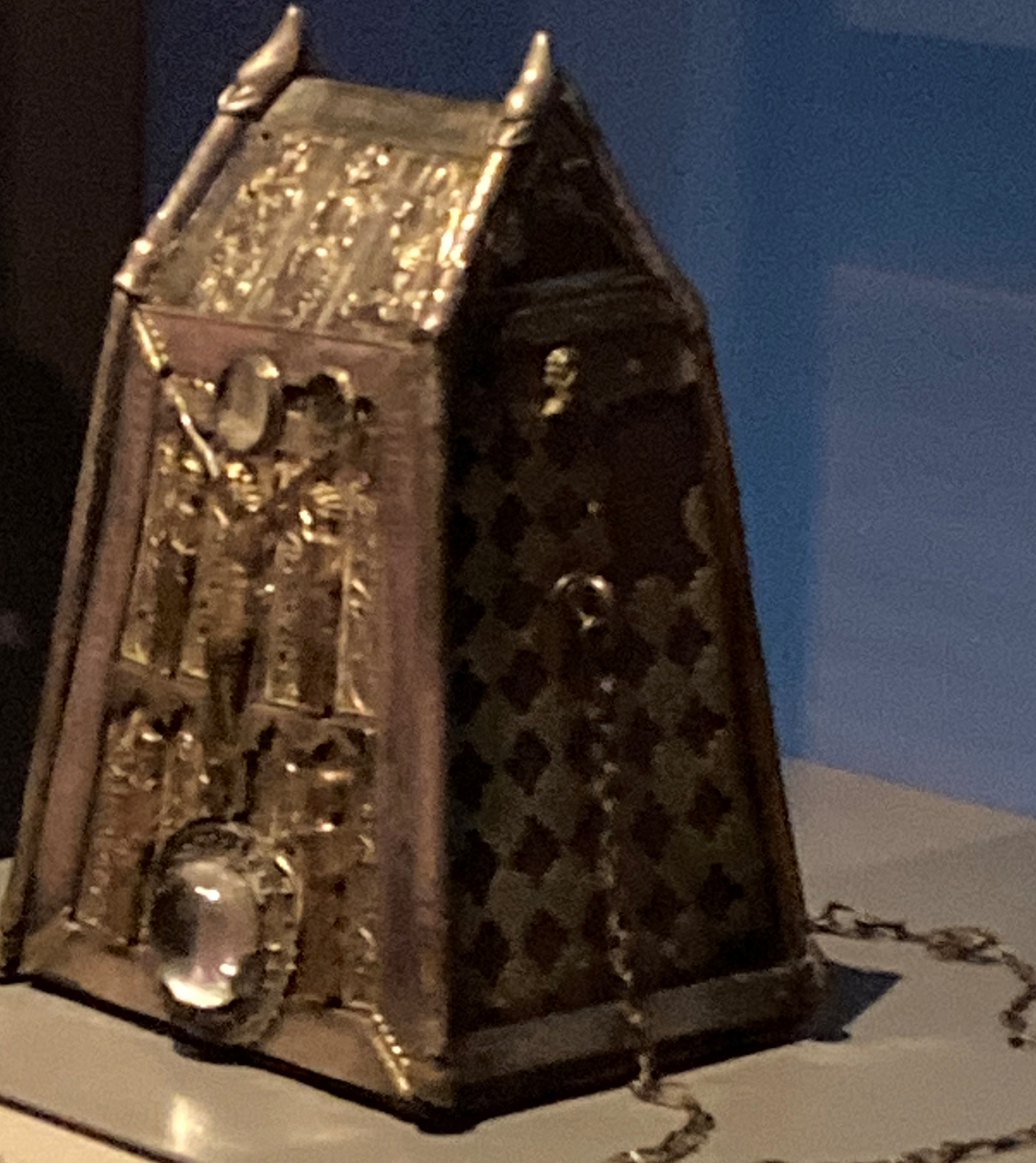
Side view of the shrine

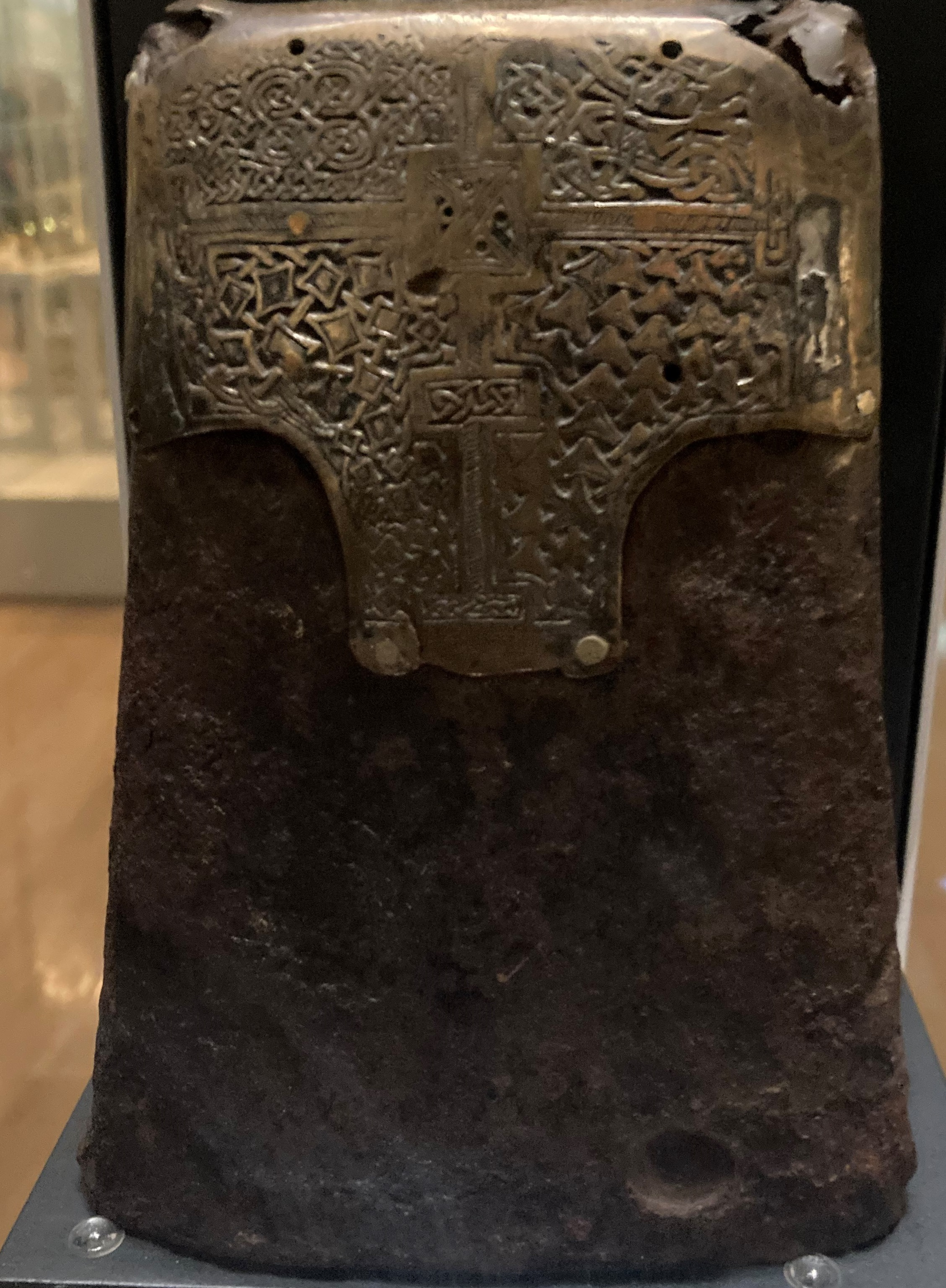
Detail of the casing

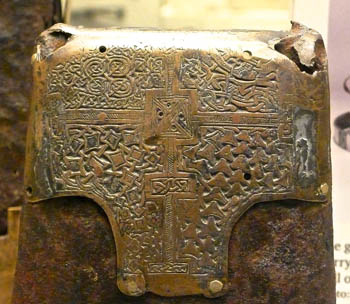
Detail of the casing

== Sources ==
- Bourke, Cormac (2020). The Early Medieval Handbells of Ireland and Britain. Dublin: Wordwell. ISBN 978-0-9017-7788-1.
- Bourke, Cormac (2014). "Bell-Shrines". In Moss, Rachel (ed.). Medieval c. 400—c. 1600: Art and Architecture of Ireland. London: Yale University Press. ISBN 978-0-3001-7919-4.
- Bourke, Cormac (1980). "Early Irish Hand-Bells". The Journal of the Royal Society of Antiquaries of Ireland. 110. JSTOR 25508775.
- Overbey, Karen (2012). Sacral Geographies: Saints, Shrines and Territory in Medieval Ireland. Turnhout: Brepols. ISBN 978-2-503-52767-3.
- Maryon, Herbert (2000). Metalwork and Enamelling. Dover. ISBN 978-0-4862-2702-3.
