= Bell Shrine of St. Cuileáin =

Bell shrine in Ireland

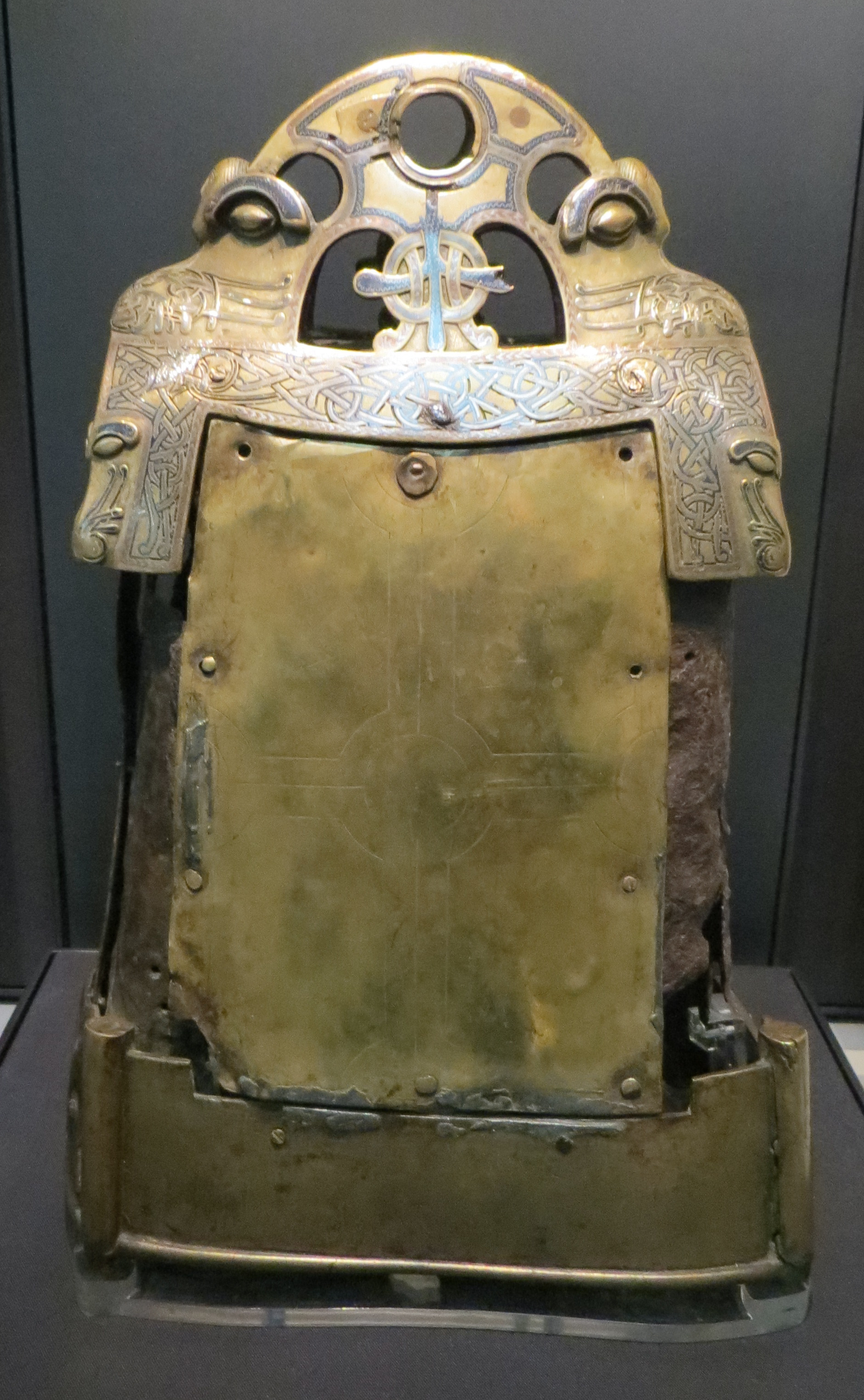
- Bell Shrine of St. Cuileáin ("Side C")
- Material: Bronze, brass, iron, gold, enamel, niello
- Size: Height: 31 cm (12 in); Width: 19 cm (7.5 in); Depth: 11.35 cm (4.47 in)
- Created: Bell: 7th or 8th centuries Shrine: 11th and 12th centuries
- Present location: British Museum, London
- Registration: 1854,0714.6

The Bell Shrine of St. Cuileáin (or the Bearnán Chúláin bell shrine or the Glenkeen bell shrine) is a late-11th or early-12th century bell shrine found in the early modern period hidden in a tree in Glenkeen, near Borrisoleigh in County Tipperary, Ireland. It was built to hold a 7th-century iron hand bell thought to have been owned by St. Cuileáin; the name "Bearnán Chúláin" translates from Irish as the "gapped [one or bell] of Cúlán".

The shrine's frame is mostly of bronze. It is capped by a horizontally shaped mound containing a wide band of openwork and interlace patterns. It terminates at each side with a large animal head, over which is an inwards-facing human head. The mound supports the arched crest, which is decorated with yellow enamel and niello.

The bell would have been used to mark canonical hours and to call for mass. Its shrine is first mentioned in Irish records in the 1600s when it was regarded as having "miraculous" healing and lie-detecting abilities. It is badly damaged, having lost all of its front plate and one of its sides. It was first mentioned in records during the 17th century, and after passing through the collections of a number of Irish antiquarians during the 18th and 19th centuries, it was acquired in 1854 by the British Museum, where it was on display. In the 1990s, it was returned to The Sacred Heart Church, Borrisoleigh.

== Dating and function ==
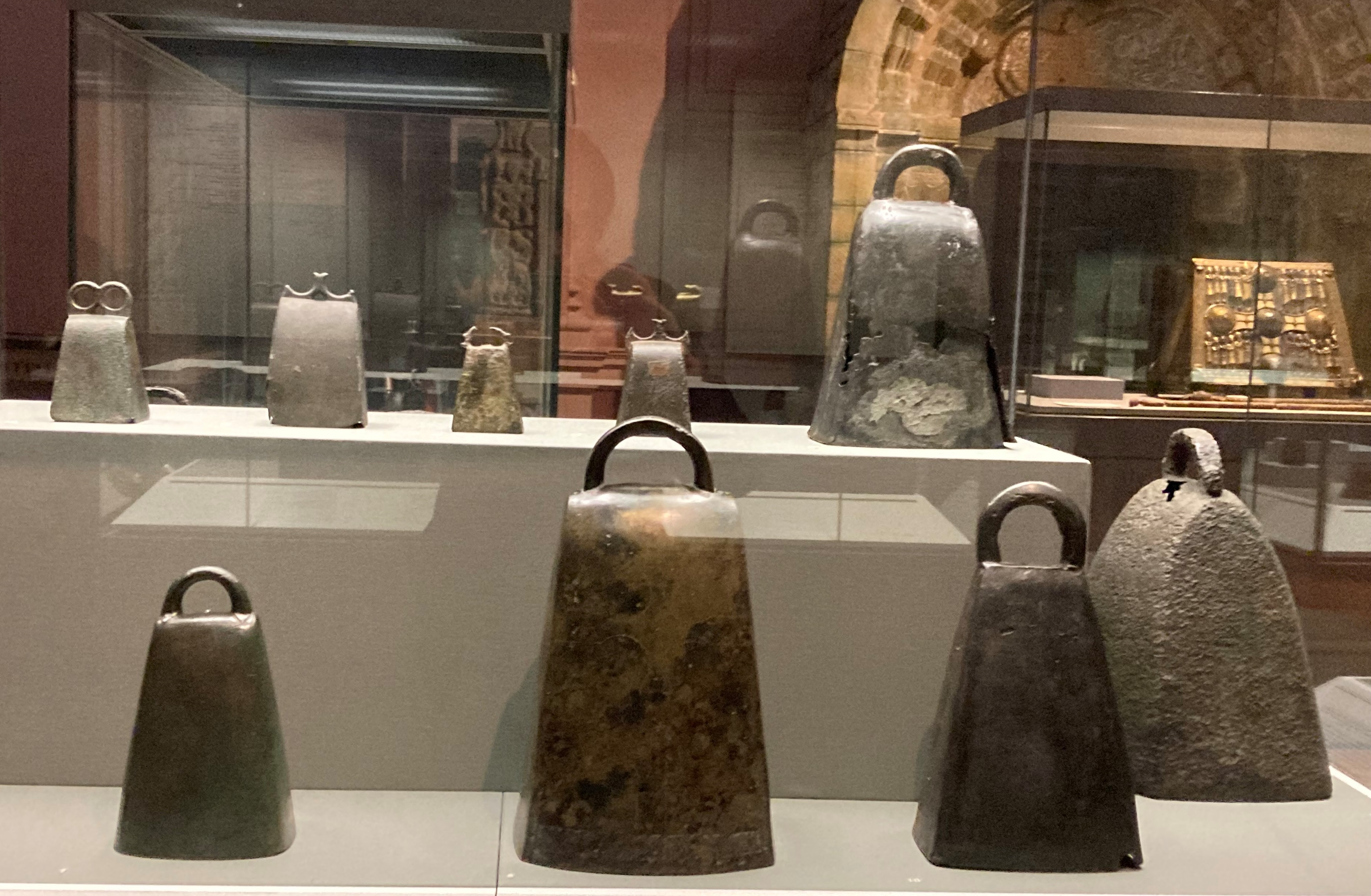
Early Irish hand-bells on display in the NMI

Objects associated with saints and church leaders were venerated for their miraculous powers and were an important feature of religious life in early medieval Ireland. Irish monasticism generally avoided dissecting the actual remains of its leaders for relics but valued objects with which they had had close personal contact. In later periods, they were often covered in elaborate metal; cumdach is a term for books treated in this way. Early monastic leaders called their small communities together for the events of their daily routine by ringing a handbell. Revered for their association with divine intervention, water drunk from the reliquaries was said to cure illnesses and bring good fortune. Other important bell shrines include the 10th-century Corp Naomh and the 11th-century St Patrick's Bell (both in the National Museum of Ireland).

Nineteen early medieval Irish or British bell shrines survive, along with several fragments (mostly crests), although many more would have been produced. Of those extant, fifteen are Irish, three are Scottish, and one is English. Most follow the general shape of a handbell capped with a crest above a semicircular cap that matches the shape of a bell handle.

== Discovery and providence ==
The bell shrine is said to have been made for the Glenkeen Monastery, founded by Saint Cuileáin in the 7th century AD. Cuileáin came from a powerful dynasty in medieval Ireland as his brother Cormac was Bishop of Cashel nearby. The bell shrine was revered for centuries by the local population and is said to have been discovered inside a tree at Kilcuilawn near Glankeen. It was purchased by the Anglo-Irish antiquarian Thomas Lalor Cooke of Birr, County Offaly, who also owned several other early medieval hand bells and fragments.

In 1825 Cooke wrote that the St. Cuileáin shrine had been discovered "some centuries before, in a hollow tree, at a place called Killcuilawn...in the parish of Glankeen...[and that]...Mrs. Dunn, to whom the Barnaan Cuilawn descended as an heirloom' from her ancestors, named Spillane, used until recently to earn a livelihood by hiring it out for people to swear upon [i.e. to swear their innocence when accused of theft]... [and that it was carried] in a strong leathern case (purposely prepared for it)."

The shrine was acquired from Cooke in 1854 by the British Museum.

== Description ==
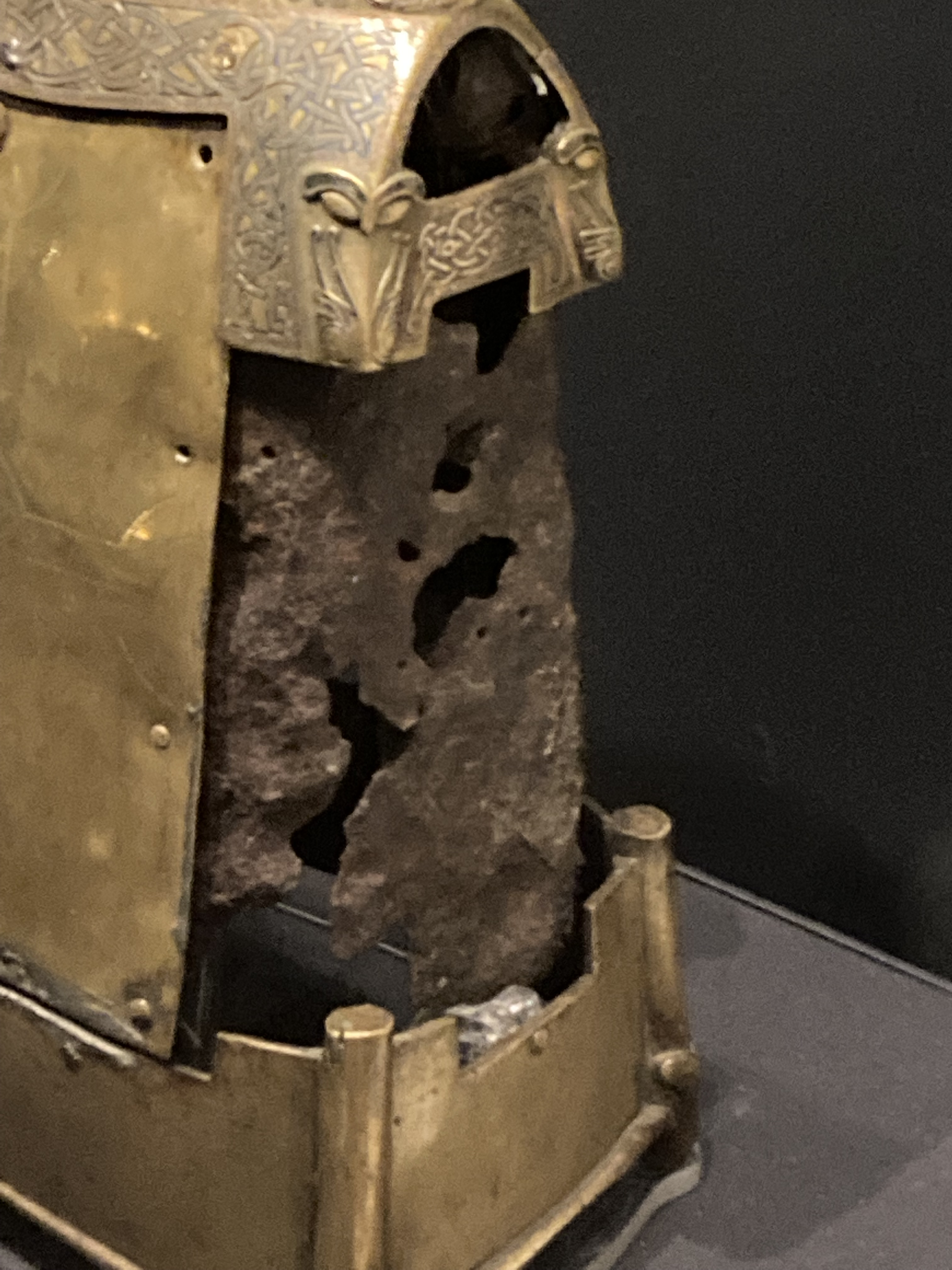
View of the badly corroded 7th century bell from side "A"

For convenience, archaeologists usually refer to the shrine's two long sides as sides "A" and "C", and the short sides as "B" and "D". Side C is generally thought to have been the front piece, and side "A" the reverse. The case and its decorations and attachments were produced in the late 11th and 12th centuries. The shrine is badly damaged and missing the covering of one of its wide (side A) and one of its short (side D) plates, leaving the original bell exposed.

The 7th-century bell is made from brazed iron but is highly corroded; the base of side "A" and the lower half of side "B" are lost, while both its upper handle and suspension loop are missing. It became known as the "Bearnán Chúláin" which translates from Irish as the "gapped [bell] of Cuileáin".

=== Shrine ===
The bell was enshrined in the 12th and 13th centuries with copper alloy sheet coverings. The shrine's base and crest were cast as single pieces. The base is rectangular and made from copper alloy. Although relatively complex in design, it is undecorated. Each corner contains a rounded moulding placed above the object's four "feet". Two of the feet are damaged to the extent that the shrine cannot stand alone without additional support.

The case was built during a number of phases beginning in the 11th century. The ribboned, zoomorphic and moustached animals on the upper portions of the short sides resemble those on the early 10th century Shrine of Saint Lachtin's Arm, while the human heads recall those on the 12th century Lismore Crozier. 18th-century descriptions mention a cross "enriched with various coloured precious stones", which was probably attached to side C, but was lost in the late 18th-century.

=== Crest ===
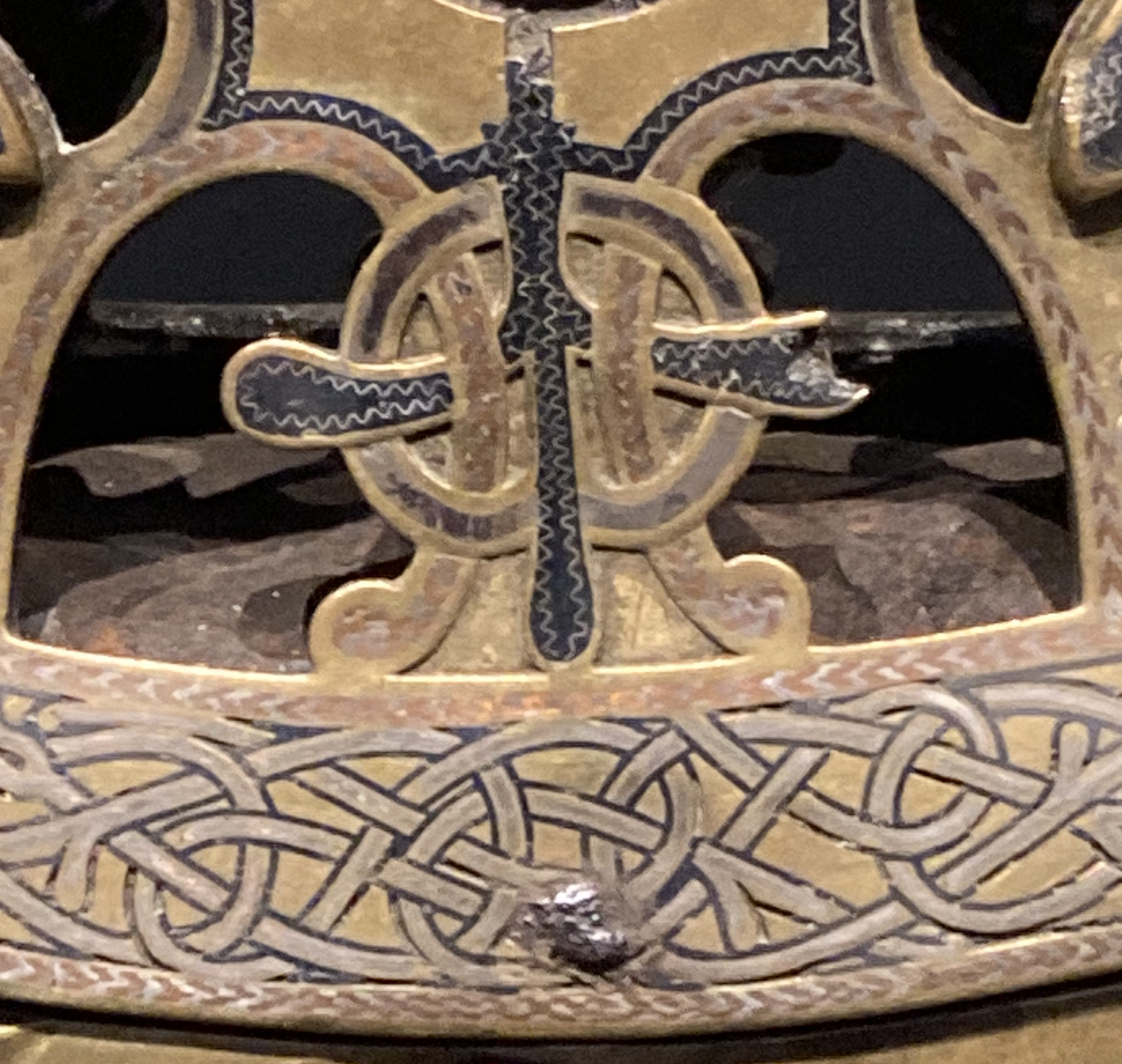
Detail of the crest above side "C"

The semi-circular, arched crest is shaped to imitate a bell handle. It contains red and yellow enamel settings, and interlace patterns achieved through champlevé, inlaid copper and silver wires placed on bands of niello. The patterns bear obvious influence from the Ringerike style, reflecting the impact of Viking art on 12th and 13th-century Irish art. The enamel settings were produced separately and are attached by rivets. There were originally five on the top of the crest, today only three survive. They are similar in style to those on the c. 1123 Cross of Cong, which were also produced independently and later attached. The archaeologist Cormac Bourke speculates that given the similarities and contemporary dating, the shrine's now lost cross would have resembled that from Cong.

The crest is dominated by two animal heads on the lower end of each long side. They have large snouts and moustaches and protruding almond-shaped eyes. Their eyebrows are inlaid (material inserted into depressions in the base object) with niello and have crossing lines of silver wire Two inwards facing human heads are placed at the pinnacles of the short-sides ("B" and "D") of the crest, between the eyes of the two animals. The figure's eyebrows and triangular moustaches were made with niello (a black mixture used as an inlay on engraved or etched metal). They both have short hair: the figure on side D's hair is crosshatched, while the hair of the figure on side "B" is parted.

== Gallery ==
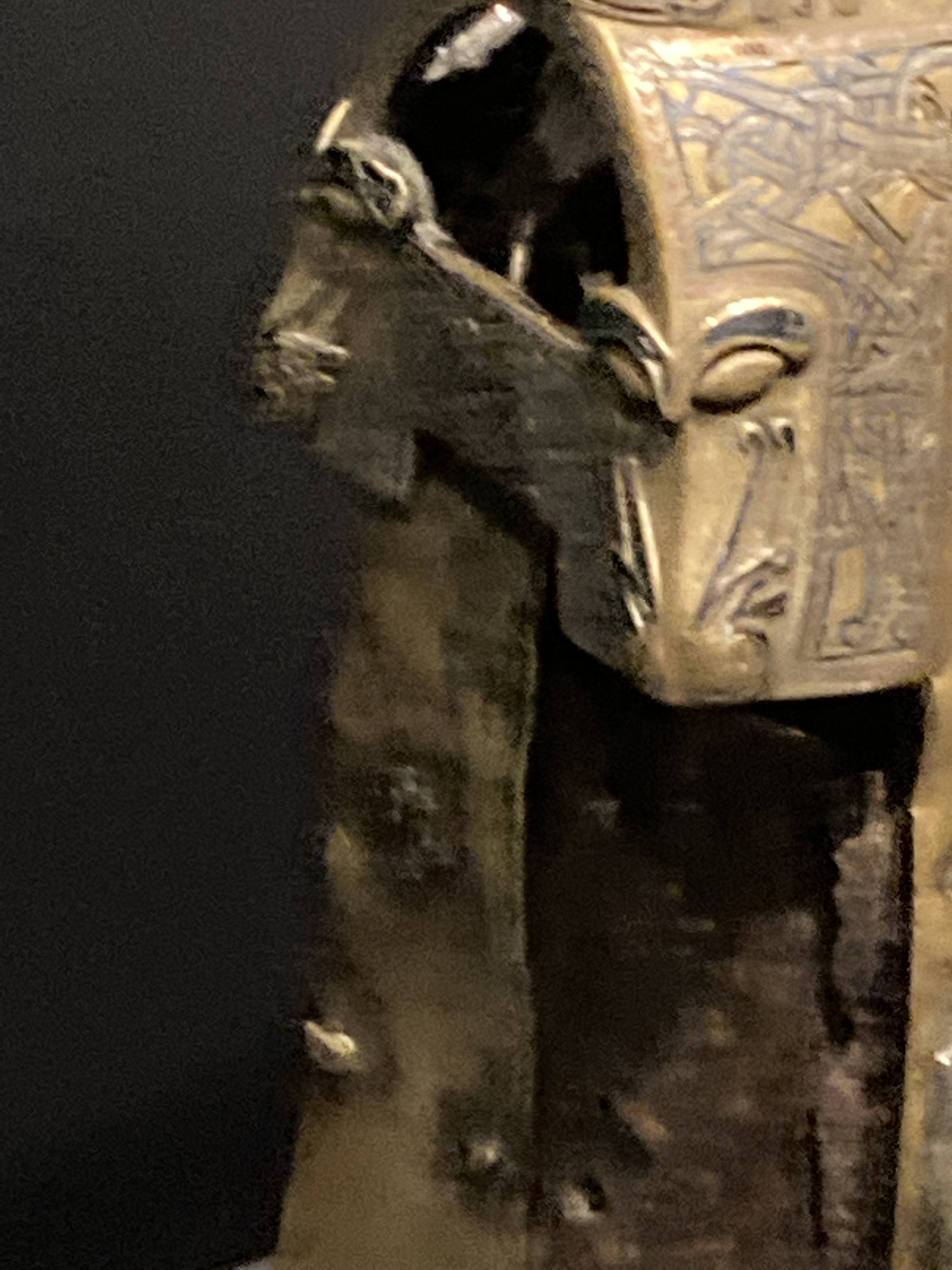
View of side B

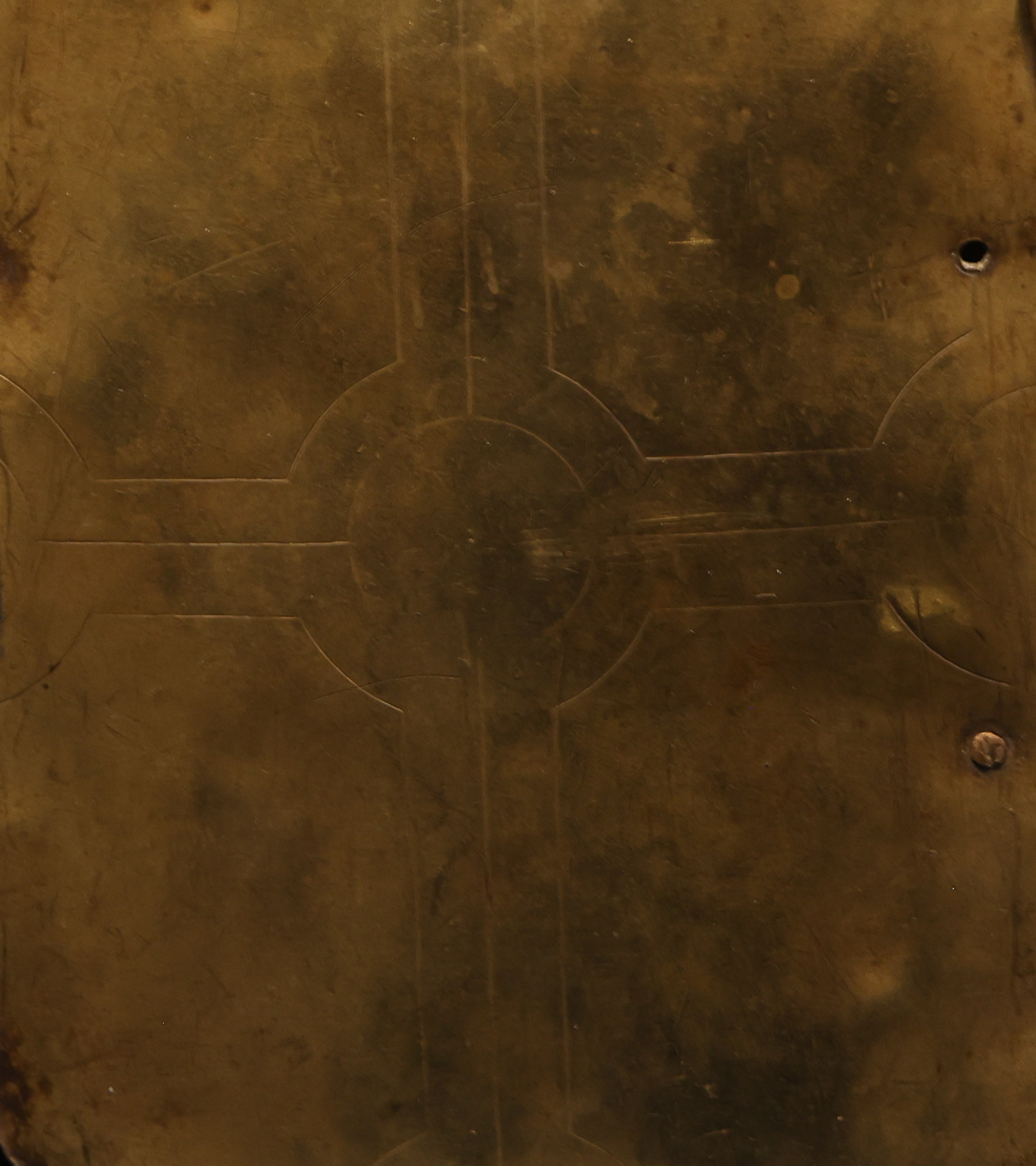
Badly faded outline of the cross engraved on the brass plate of side C

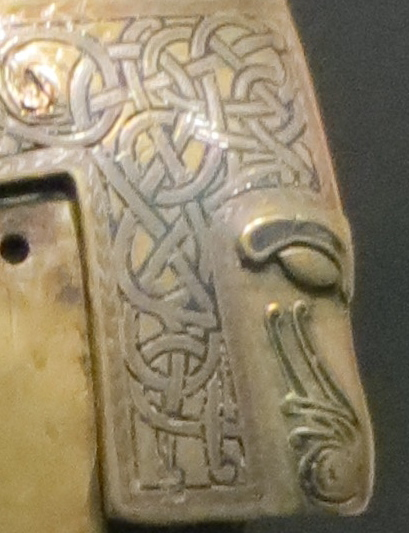
Ringerike style patterns on the cap

== Sources ==
- Bourke, Cormac (2022). The Early Medieval Handbells of Ireland and Britain. Dublin: Wordwell. ISBN 978-0-9017-7788-1.
- Bourke, Cormac (2014). "Bell-Shrines". In Moss, Rachel (ed.). Medieval c. 400—c. 1600: Art and Architecture of Ireland. London: Yale University Press. ISBN 978-0-3001-7919-4.
- Bourke, Cormac (1980). "Early Irish Hand-Bells". The Journal of the Royal Society of Antiquaries of Ireland. 110: 52–66. JSTOR 25508775.
- Crawford, Henry (June 1923). "A Descriptive List of Irish Shrines and Reliquaries. Part I". The Journal of the Royal Society of Antiquaries of Ireland. 6. 13 (1): 74–93. JSTOR 25513282.
- Murray, Griffin (2016). "The Bearnán Chúláin bell-shrine from Glenkeen, Co. Tipperary: an archaeological and historical analysis". Journal of the Cork Historical and Archaeological Society. 121. Archived from the original on 2025-04-26.
- Murray, Griffin (2014). The Cross of Cong: A Masterpiece of Medieval Irish Art. Irish Academic Press. ISBN 978-0-7165-3274-3.
- Overbey, Karen (2012). Sacral Geographies: Saints, Shrines and Territory in Medieval Ireland. Turnhout: Brepols. ISBN 978-2-503-52767-3.
