= Bell Shrine of St. Mura =

Bell shrine in Ireland

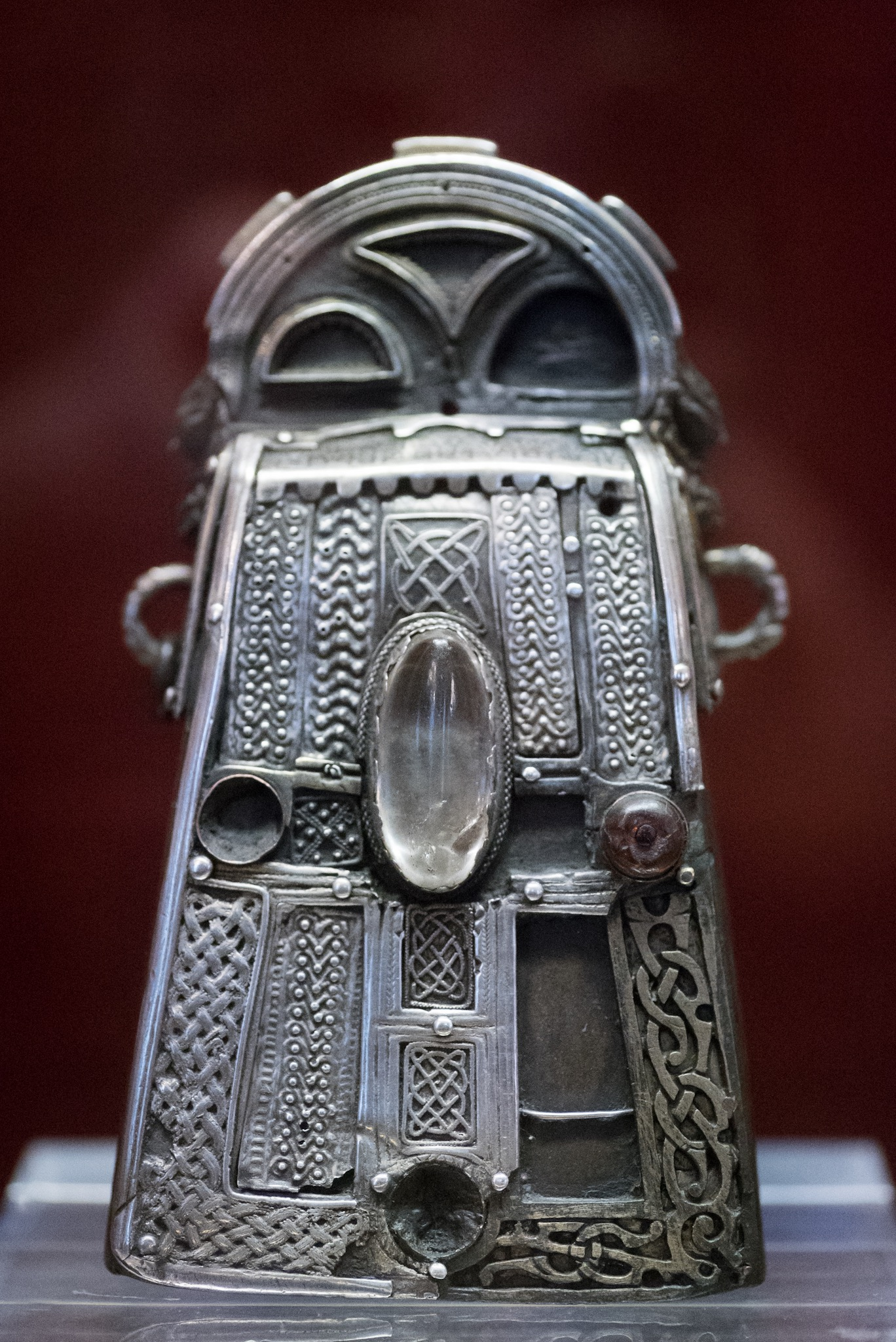
- Bell Shrine of St. Mura
- Material: Bronze with silver, gild-silver and rock crystal additions
- Size: Height: 15.5 cm (6.1 in); Width: 8.7 cm (3.4 in); Depth: 6.7 cm (2.6 in)
- Created: 11th to 16th centuries
- Present location: Wallace Collection, London
- Identification: J498

The Bell Shrine of St. Mura is an 11th-century Irish shrine traditionally associated with the Abbey of Fahan, County Donegal, Ireland, founded by Saint Mura (c. 550–645). It consists of a handbell enshrined in a copper container (or shrine), later embellished with silver, gild-silver and rock crystal additions in four phases ending in the 16th century. The first and most significant of the later phases introduced interlace, openwork and filigree patterns.

The shrine is traditionally thought to relieve pain and suffering; in some accounts pregnant women would drink from it in the hope of a painless birth. It was in the possession of hereditary keepers until the mid-19 century, and has been in the Wallace Collection, London, since 1879.

== Description ==
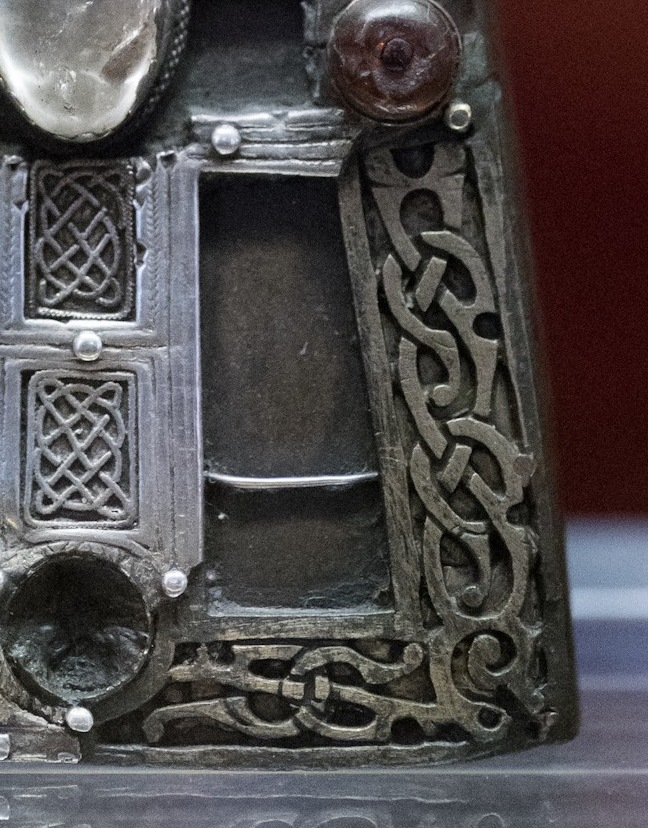
Interlace patterns on the lower right hand quadrant

The shrine is 15.5 cm (6.1 in) in height, 8.7 cm (3.4 in) wide, and has a depth of 6.7 cm (2.6 in). The main body of the front is made up of four quadrants or panels with a large, oval rock crystal stone at the centre, which is likely of the final phase. The quadrants are positioned on a silver plate secured to the core with rivets. The quadrant plates are arranged to suggest the shape of a Latin cross.

The frontispiece is capped by a semi-circular crest placed over the handle of the original bell. The crest consists of three high relief animal heads, each lined by openwork patterns, and is usually dated by archaeologists to the shrine's first phase, in the second half of the 11th century.

During the second phase, dated to roughly the 14th century, additional gilt-silver ornamentation and animal heads were introduced, as well as the openwork on the lower right-hand quadrant. The craftsmen working on the third phase introduced die-stamped foils, the central rock crystal cabochon, and the filigree to the two upper panels.

During the third and final phases, craftsmen added die stamp herringbone patterns and additional filigree to the two upper front panels.

== Provenance ==
Like many early Medieval artifacts, the Bell Shrine of St. Mura was kept locally for centuries by hereditary keepers; a group of families so called because they held and protected ancient Irish religious objects over the course of the 10th century Viking raids, the 12th-century dissolution of monasteries, and for later centuries until the poverty wrought in the aftermath of the 1845–1852 Great Famine forced many of the families into placing the objects into sale.

It was first mentioned in modern records in 1850 when purchased for six pounds by the antiquarian John McClelland of Dungannon from Reynolds of Innishowen. McClelland published an 1853 paper detailing the folk legends associated with it, and exhibited the shrine in Belfast in 1852 and in Dublin the following year. It was later sold at auction at Christie's, London, to Lord Londesborough for 72 guineas, before passing to a Paris-based antiquities dealer. The shrine was acquired in 1879 by the wealthy Sir Richard Wallace from a Charles Davis. Wallace owned significant land and estates in County Antrim and was interested in preserving local Irish early medieval objects.

It remains in the Wallace Collection, London.

== Sources ==
- Bourke, Cormac (2020). The Early Medieval Handbells of Ireland and Britain. Dublin: Wordwell. ISBN 978-0-9017-7788-1.
- Bourke, Cormac (1980). "Early Irish Hand-Bells". The Journal of the Royal Society of Antiquaries of Ireland. 110. JSTOR 25508775.
- Milligan, Seaton (March 1903). "Ancient Ecclesiastical Bells in Ulster". The Journal of the Royal Society of Antiquaries of Ireland. 5. 13 (33). JSTOR 25507271.
- Ó Riain, Padrig (2006). "The Bann Bell-Shrine Crest: A Note on Its Provenance and Inscription". The Journal of the Royal Society of Antiquaries of Ireland. 5. 136. JSTOR 25509132.
