= Shrine of St. Senan's Bell =

- Clogán Óir
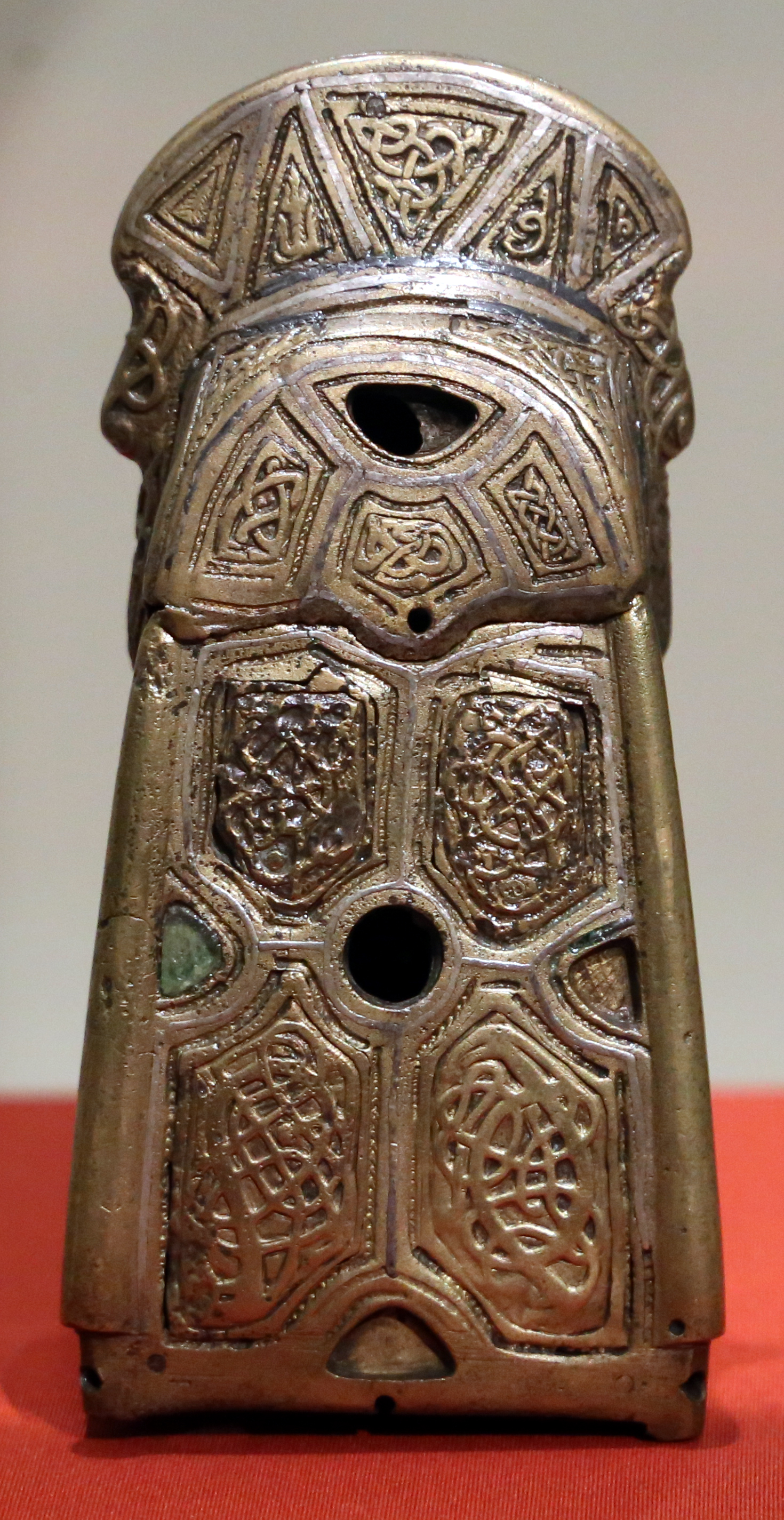
- Shrine of St. Senan's Bell
- Material: Bronze, brass, silver, niello
- Size: Height: 12.5 cm (4.9 in); Width: 6.5 cm (2.6 in); Depth: 8.6 cm (3.4 in)
- Created: Inner Shrine: c. 1100; Outer Shrine: 14th century
- Discovered: before 1826
- Present location: National Museum of Ireland, Dublin

The Shrine of St. Senan's Bell (or the Clogán Óir, English Little Golden Bell) is a small early medieval Irish bell shrine. It is associated with the 6th-century Christian minister Senán mac Geirrcinn and was rediscovered on Inis Cathaigh (Scattery Island), County Clare before 1826.

The shrine was built in two phases. The two hollow bronze shells and the semi-circular cap date to the late 11th or early 12th century. The 14th century additions include the engraved outer gilt-sliver sheet.

== Description ==
The primary inner shrine, the Clogán Óir, is made from bronze c. 1100 to encase a small but now lost handbell. The cap (or crest) was made to cover the handle of the bell, while the lower portion covered the main body of the bell. A cross design is present on each panel face. The cross and four panels on either face of the original shell closely resemble the designs found on earlier cumdachs (book shrines).

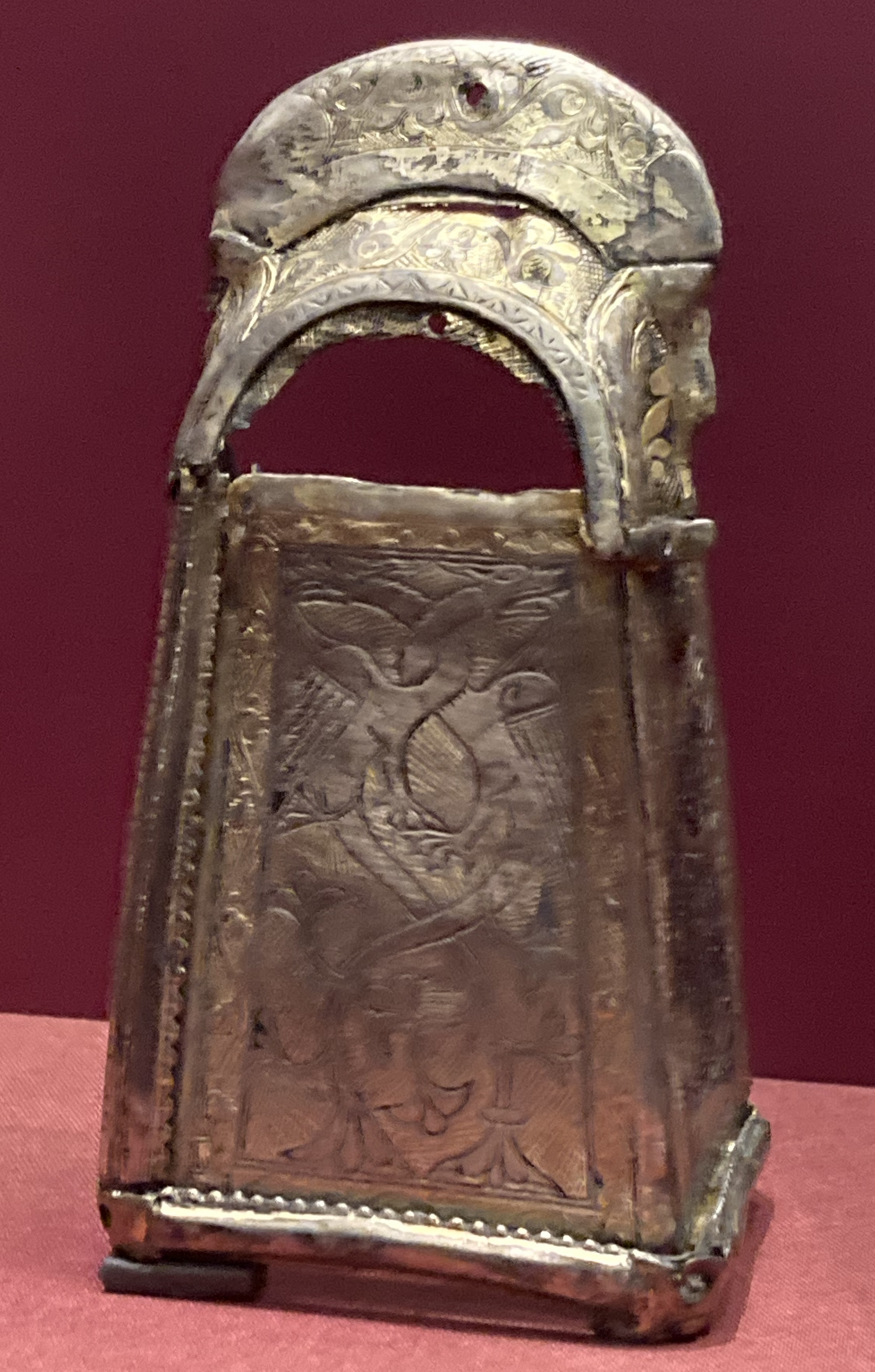
The shrine's outer casing

The outer casing dates to the 14th century and include the engraved outer gilt-sliver sheet. The two dragon designs on this casing. While the shrine itself is conventionally referred to as a bell shrine, it is likely just decorative and was created for display rather than use.

There are no visible inscriptions.

== Provenance ==
The shrine is traditionally associated with mainland County Clare. It had been held on Inis Cathaigh (Scattery Island) by its hereditary keepers: the O'Keane family held it until 1730 when it passed to the MacCahan family, who kept it until the late-19th or early-20th century.

An August 13, 1918 advertisement for its sale was published in the London Times. It eventually sold at Christie's to G. W. Panter for 1,250 guineas, before he donated it to the Royal Irish Academy. The Academy later donated the shrine to the National Museum of Ireland, Dublin.

== Sources ==
- Armstrong, E. C. R. (December 31, 1919). "The Bell-Shrine of St Seanan, Known as the Clogán Óir". The Journal of the Royal Society of Antiquaries of Ireland. 9 (2). Royal Society of Antiquaries of Ireland: 132–135.
- Bourke, Cormac (2020). The Early Medieval Handbells of Ireland and Britain. Dublin: Wordwell Press. ISBN 978-0-9017-7788-1.
- Bourke, Cormac (2014). "Bell-Shrines". In Moss, Rachel (ed.). Medieval c. 400—c. 1600: Art and Architecture of Ireland. London: Yale University Press. ISBN 978-0-3001-7919-4.
- Carpenter, Andrew (2015). Art and Architecture of Ireland Volume I: Medieval c. 400–c. 1600. Dublin: Royal Irish Academy. p. 308.
- Ó Floinn, Raghnal; Wallace, Patrick (2002). Treasures of the National Museum of Ireland: Irish Antiquities. Dublin: National Museum of Ireland. ISBN 978-0-7171-2829-7.
- Westropp, Thomas Johnson (1915). "Ancient Remains on the West Coast of Claire". Journal of the North Munster Archaeological Society. 3 (4): 357.
