= Guthrie Bell Shrine =

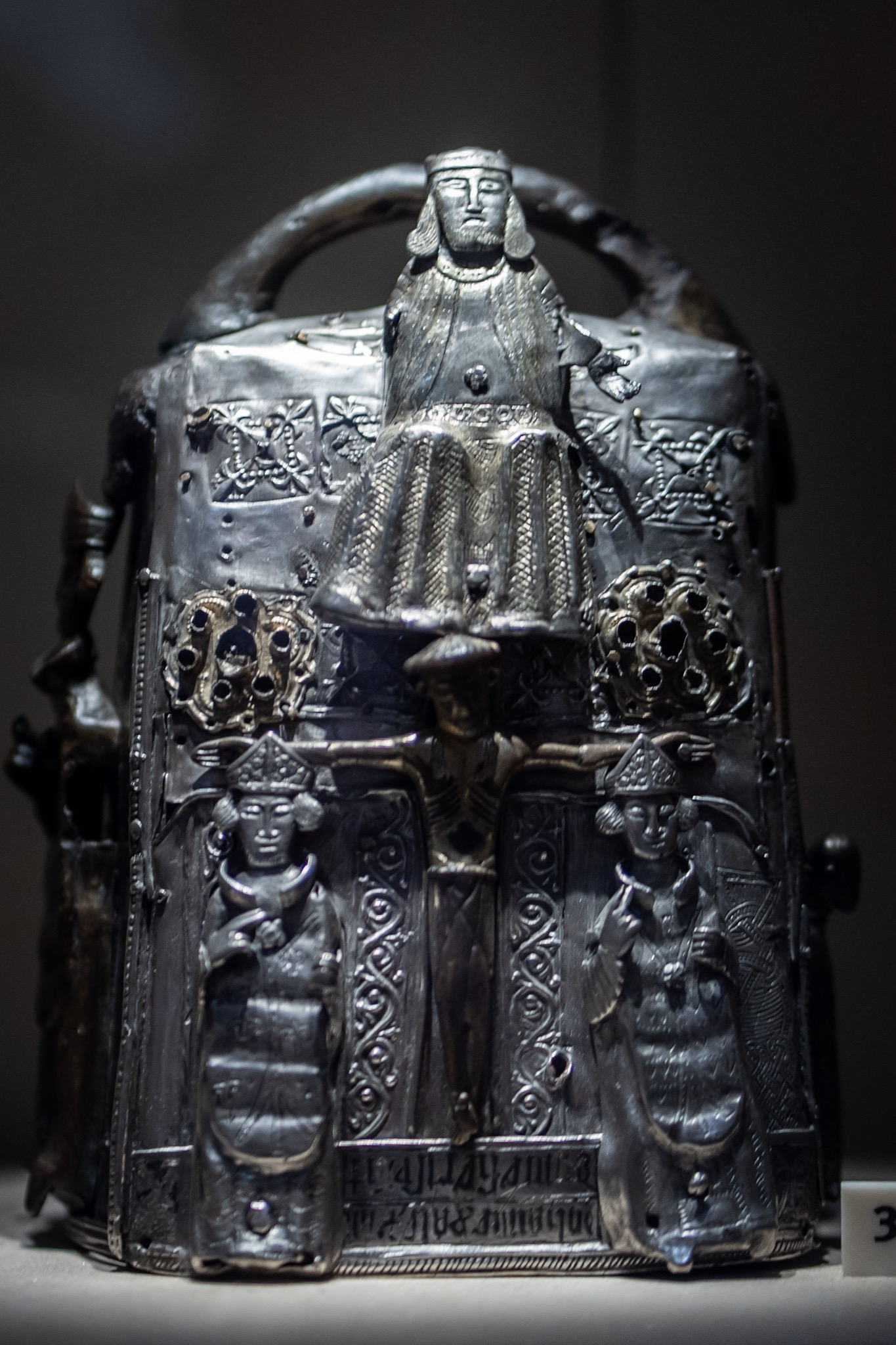
- Guthrie Bell Shrine
- Material: Iron, Copper, Silver
- Size: Height: 8.5 in (220 mm); Width: 5.5 in (140 mm)
- Writing: Latin: lohannes alexan dri me fieri feisit.
- Created: 12th Century
- Present location: National Museum of Scotland

The Guthrie Bell Shrine is a 12th century bell shrine associated with Guthrie Castle, located in Scotland. The shrine is one of only two to have survived in Scotland. It is unknown which saint it was attributed to. The shrine was likely reconstructed two times.

== Provenance ==
The Guthrie Bell has been traditionally preserved at Guthrie Castle in Scotland. How it arrived at the castle is unknown. Previous to arriving to the National Museum of Scotland it was held by the Guthrie family. It likely began to be held by the family in 1479.

== Description ==
The bell is made of iron, both sides of it are riveted. The handle is also made of iron with the bow being made of copper. The casing covers all four sides of the bell with some of the plates overlapping. Both the front and back plates curve. There is a handle on its left side and there was likely also a handle at one point on its right side. The front of the shrine has a bronze crucifix.

At the base of the shrine there is a latin inscription reading: "lohannes alexan dri me fieri feisit".

== Sources ==
- Scot., F. S. A. (1926). "The Guthrie Bell and its Shrine". Proceedings of the Society of Antiquaries of Scotland. 60. Society of Antiquaries of Scotland: 409–420. doi:10.9750/PSAS.060.409.420.
- "Primitive Hand-Bells". Proceedings of the Society of Antiquaries of Scotland. 1. Society of Antiquaries of Scotland: 54–57. 1852. doi:10.9750/PSAS.001.54.57.
- Morris, Ernest (1952). Bells of all Nations. Robert Hale Limited. p. 92.
