= St. Mel's Crozier =

Insular crozier from County Longford, Ireland

St. Mel's crook plate

St. Mel's Crozier was a fully intact 10th or 11th century Insular crozier discovered in the mid-19th century on the grounds of an early medieval church in Ardagh, County Longford. It consisted of a wooden core lined with metal sheet tubing decorated with silver, coral and glass, as well as three knopes and a ring towards its base. The drop plate was formed by a separately formed wood block, which was added to in the 12th century with a figure of a cleric or bishop wearing a mitre and holding a staff.

Although it had been in good condition and was fully intact, the crozier was "almost entirely destroyed" in 2009 when its holding location St Mel's Cathedral (built c. 1840) was decimated in a disastrous fire that destroyed over 200 objects, including stained glass windows by Harry Clarke.

== Description ==
St. Mel's Crozier is built from 14 separate metallic parts, with the wooden core lined with silver, gilding, glass and coral. The shaft is 84 cm long. The crook is made from oak, while the drop has a willow core.

The wooden core could be divided into three parts, each now lined with nail holes The collar knope is designed to hold eight decorative stones, of which three survive: two red coral and one blue glass stone. The staff contains a number of secondary nail holes, indicating that it may have been "dismantled and repaired several times in the past".

It is so dated based on the style of the zoomorphic designs, which are similar to those on the Kells Crozier. The drop's metal casting is secondary (of a later date) and has an inset (cavity) to hold a reliquary box, which is now filled with a small block of wood. However the reliquary box is slightly too small for the drop, and was probably also a later addition, likely to replace a similar, slightly larger fitting.

== Remains ==
While well preserved (a number of the plates were damaged, and its last major cleaning and refurbishment was carried out between 1971–2) and studied to that point, the crozier was "almost entirely destroyed" in 2009 when St Mel's Cathedral was decimated in a fire. In the aftermath, over 200 recovered objects, including stained glass windows by Harry Clarke and St. Mel's Crozier, were taken to the National Museum of Ireland for assessment and restoration, although such was the extent of devastation that many were "beyond help".

== Sources ==
- Bourke, Cormac. "St Mel's Cathedral fire". Archaeology Ireland, volume 24, no. 1, Spring 2010.
- Oddy, W. A.; McIntyre, I. M. "St. Mel's Crozier: Technical Examination and Report on Conservation and Restoration in 1971-2". The Journal of the Royal Society of Antiquaries of Ireland, volume 103, 1973. JSTOR 25508613
- Michelli, Perette. "Four Scottish crosiers and their relation to the Irish tradition". Proceedings of the Society of Antiquaries of Scotland, 118, 1986
- Moss, Rachel. Medieval c. 400—c. 1600: Art and Architecture of Ireland. New Haven, CT: Yale University Press, 2014. ISBN 978-0-3001-7919-4
