= Bell shrine =

Metal objects used to enshrine bells

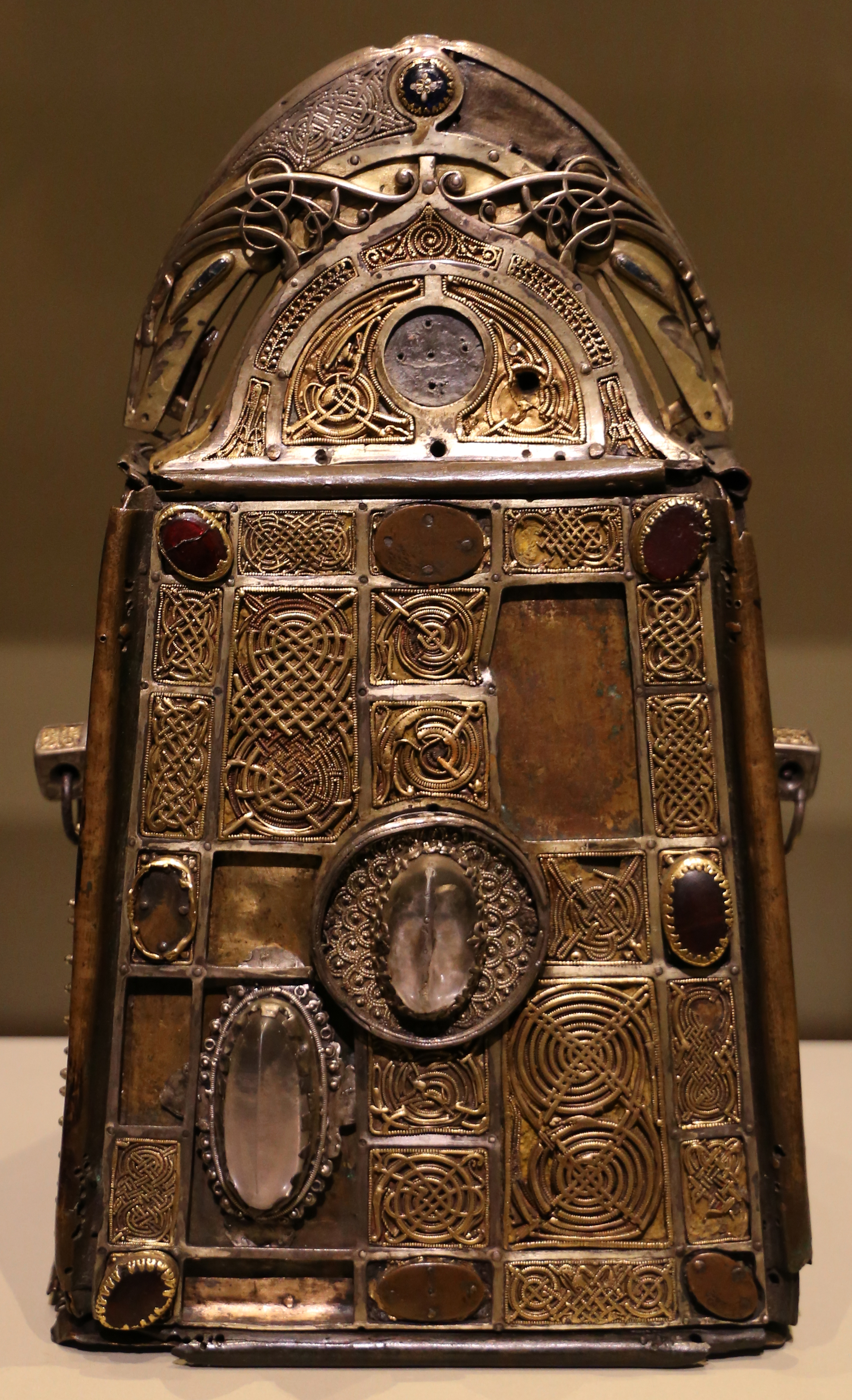
Shrine of St. Patrick's Bell, 11th century, National Museum of Ireland

Bell shrines are metal objects built to hold individual early medieval hand-bells, particularly those associated with early Irish saints. Although the enshrinement of bells lasted from the 9th to the 16th centuries, the more well-known examples date from the 11th century. Nineteen such Irish or British bell shrines survive, along with several fragments (mostly crests), although many more would have been produced. Of those extant, fifteen are Irish, three are Scottish and one is English. Most follow the general shape of a hand-bell capped with a crest above a semicircular cap that matches the shape of a bell handle.

The shrines are mostly of bronze and decorated with silver, rock crystal and niello. They can be classified into two basic formats; at first as fixed mounds attached to the bell known as "applied" shrines (eight examples) and later as separate autonomous metal containers (eleven examples). Those of the latter type could no longer be rung and so were used for ceremonial or display purposes only. Decorative material includes silver, gold, glass and rock crystal, and of designs using filigree, cloisonné, openwork, and interlace patterns. The majority are in the collections of the National Museum of Ireland (NMI), the National Museum of Scotland (NMS) and the British Museum (BM).

The surviving examples are undated and unprovenanced, and very few have inscriptions. A number were found in bogs, within church walls, or at the bottom of rivers, presumably after they were hidden during the Viking and later Anglo-Norman invasions of Ireland. Others were kept by successive generations of hereditary keepers but by the 17th century, had become seen as objects of superstition and of low historical value. The revaluation of early medieval metalwork craftsmanship began in the mid-19th century and since an 1838 a lecture by George Petrie on "ancient Irish consecrated Bells", a number of these shrines are considered highpoints of both Irish and Scottish Insular and early Romanesque metalwork.

== Early Irish and Scottish hand-bells ==
=== Origins ===
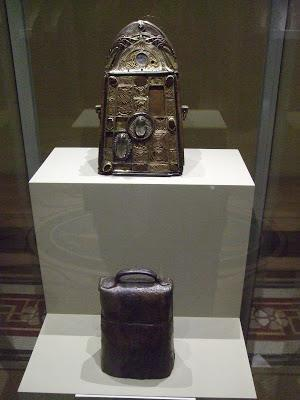
View of the St. Patrick's bell and shrine on display

Early Irish church hand-bells (Irish: clog) are the most numerous surviving forms of early medieval relics from either Ireland, England or Wales, and were likely the most prestigious, given they were widely thought to have been built either for or by the saint. Approximately 300 examples are known, with the majority produced between the 5th and early 12th centuries. The bells were passed between generations of successive abbots and clerics, and served a number of communal functions, including the marking of canonical hours and calling for mass. However, by the 12th century hand-bells had largely been replaced by larger church tower bells, and although many stayed in use, their production declined.

In the early medieval period, monks served a number of functions in the communities in which they lived. At the most fundamental level, their devotions and prayers were seen intercessory between mortals and the divine, and so were seen as mediators for the community. This role was reinforced in the settlements where the monks held a bell relic from an early insular church saint. The role of mediator appears in the hagiography of a number of such saints; Patrick (fl. 5th century) supposedly made "a pact [with God] for favourable treatment of the Irish in exchange for his services as a missionary". Later the bell of Ciarán of Saigir (d. c. 530) was "taken through the surrounding district for the co-swearing of chieftans [...] and the exaction of the tributes of the saint's monastery."

=== Types ===
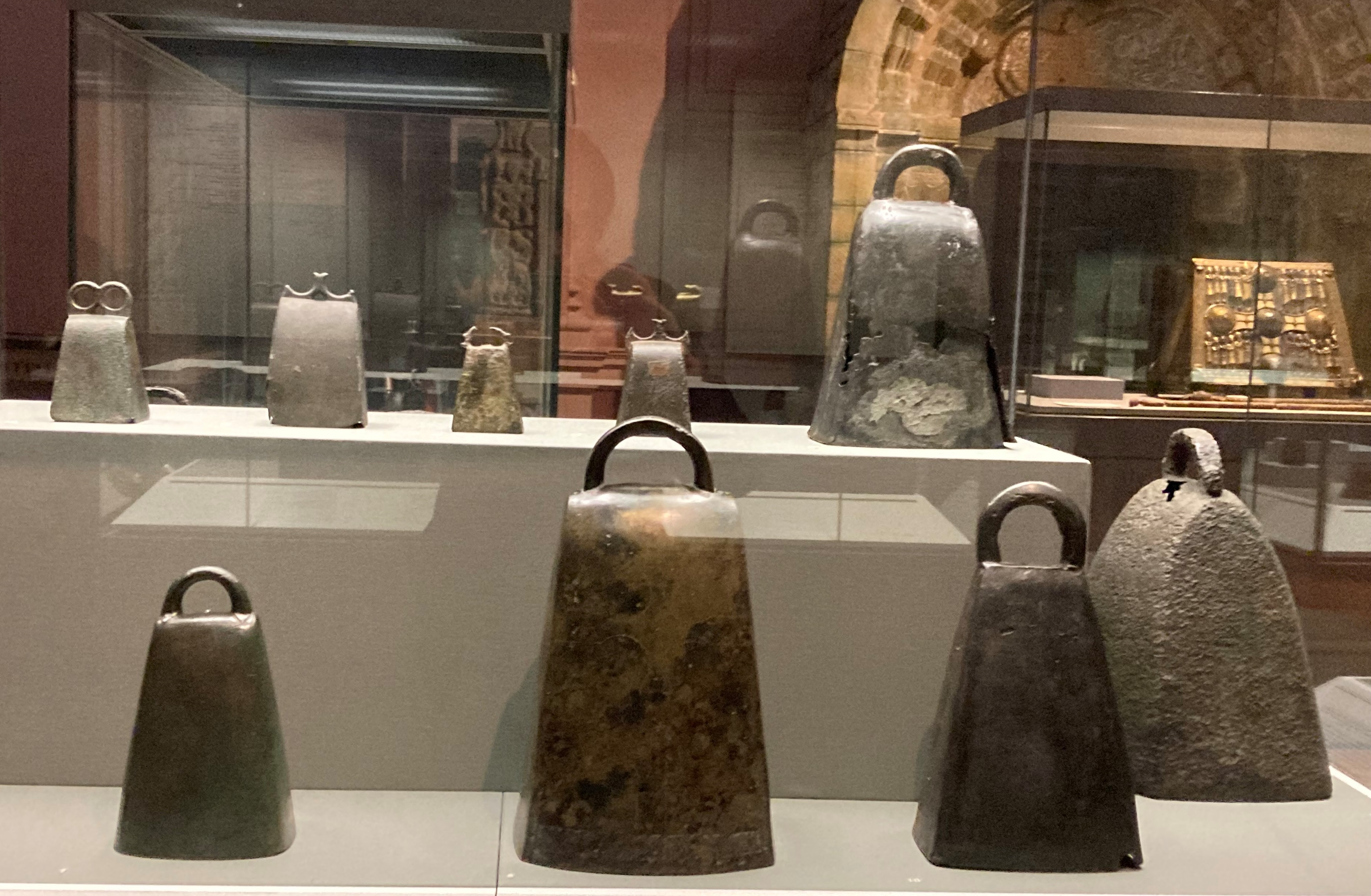
Early Irish hand-bells on display in the NMI

The bells vary in size and level and type of decoration depending on their age. They typically have a tapered quadrilateral shape. Of the seventy-three surviving examples identified in 1980 by the archeologist Cormac Bourke, forty-two are of iron and the rest of bronze. He identified two broad groups. His class 1 bells are made from sheet iron plates lined with bronze coating and joined by rivets, range in height from 14 cm (5.5 in) to 31 cm (12 in) and were constructed by folding the main sheet along its short axis and then folding its shoulder-pieces to cover the crest and top edges. Class 2 bells are in cast bronze, with the bell and handle cast as a single piece. They are usually slightly smaller, with a range from 31 cm (12 in). Class 4 bells, dating from the 9th century and produced until the 16th century, designate the numerous replicas or imitations of earlier bells.

A small number of the later shrines and shrine fragments have inscriptions. Some have decorative lozenges, perhaps drawing from Carolingian Ivory carving. All of the extant shrines were built for iron bells; presumably as this class was older, they were more likely to be associated with a known early saint. Several were thought to have been owned or constructed by saints such as Patrick, Colum Cille and Kentigern.

== Function ==
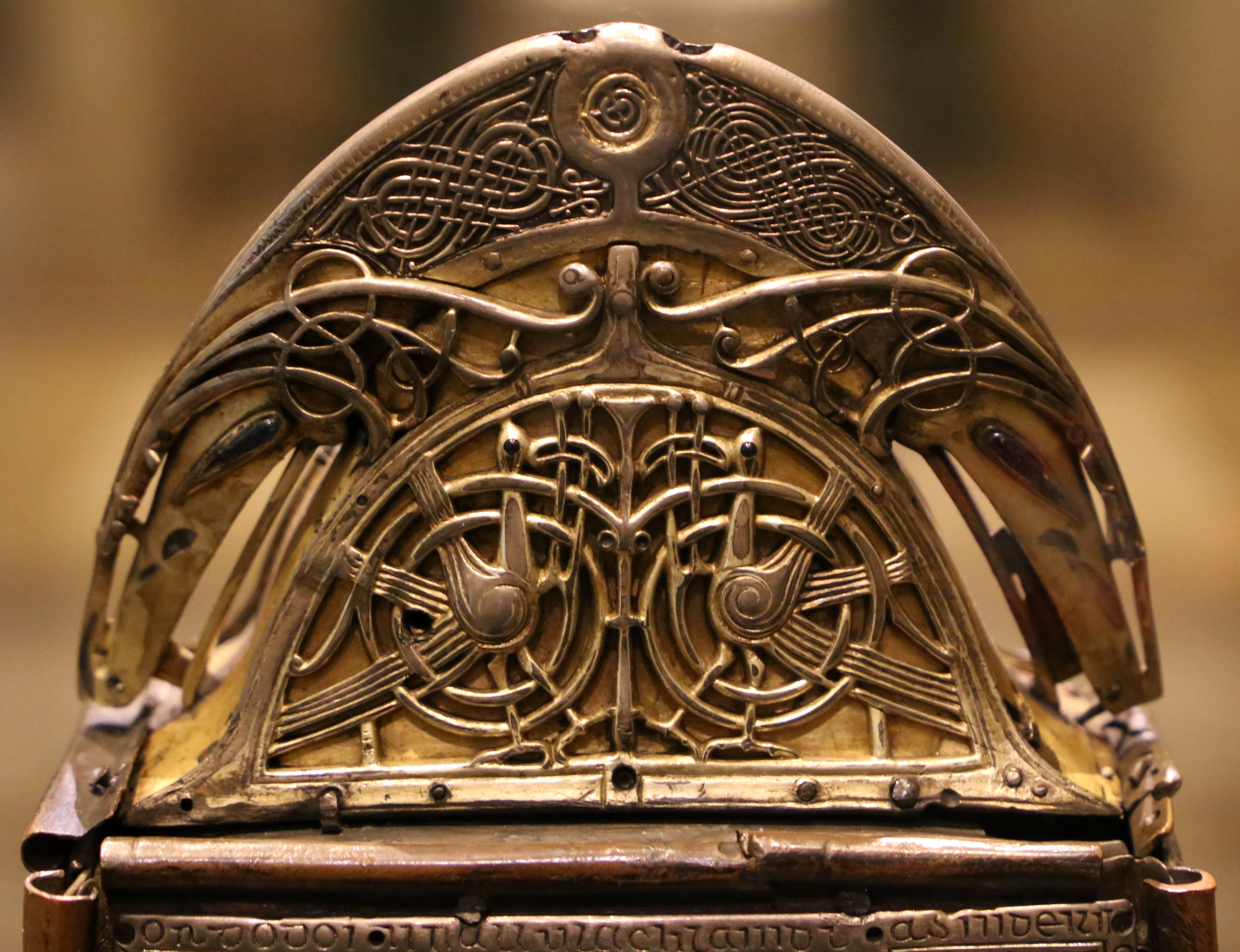
Cap and crest of the Shrine of St. Patrick's Bell

The shrines were commissioned to bestow status and the ecclesiastical location or office holding the original bell-relic. According to Bourke, "enshrinement promoted bells as ecclesiastical trophies and accessories to saint's cults." Objects associated with early saints were venerated in Ireland and Britain during the early medieval period for their reputed miraculous powers and became an important feature of religious life. Irish monasticism generally avoided dissecting the corporeal remains of its leaders for relics and instead venerated objects with which the saint had had close personal contact. From the 10th century, relics were often cased in elaborate metal covering, with bell shrines, staffs, cumdachs (book shrines), house-shaped shrines and pieces of clothing being the most common types. The practice of enshrinement was so unique to Ireland that Gerald of Wales (d. c. 1223) remarked the Irish had "great reverence [for] bells that can be carried about, and staffs belonging to the saints,...so much so that they fear to swear or perjure themselves in making oaths on these, much more than they do in swearing on the gospels".

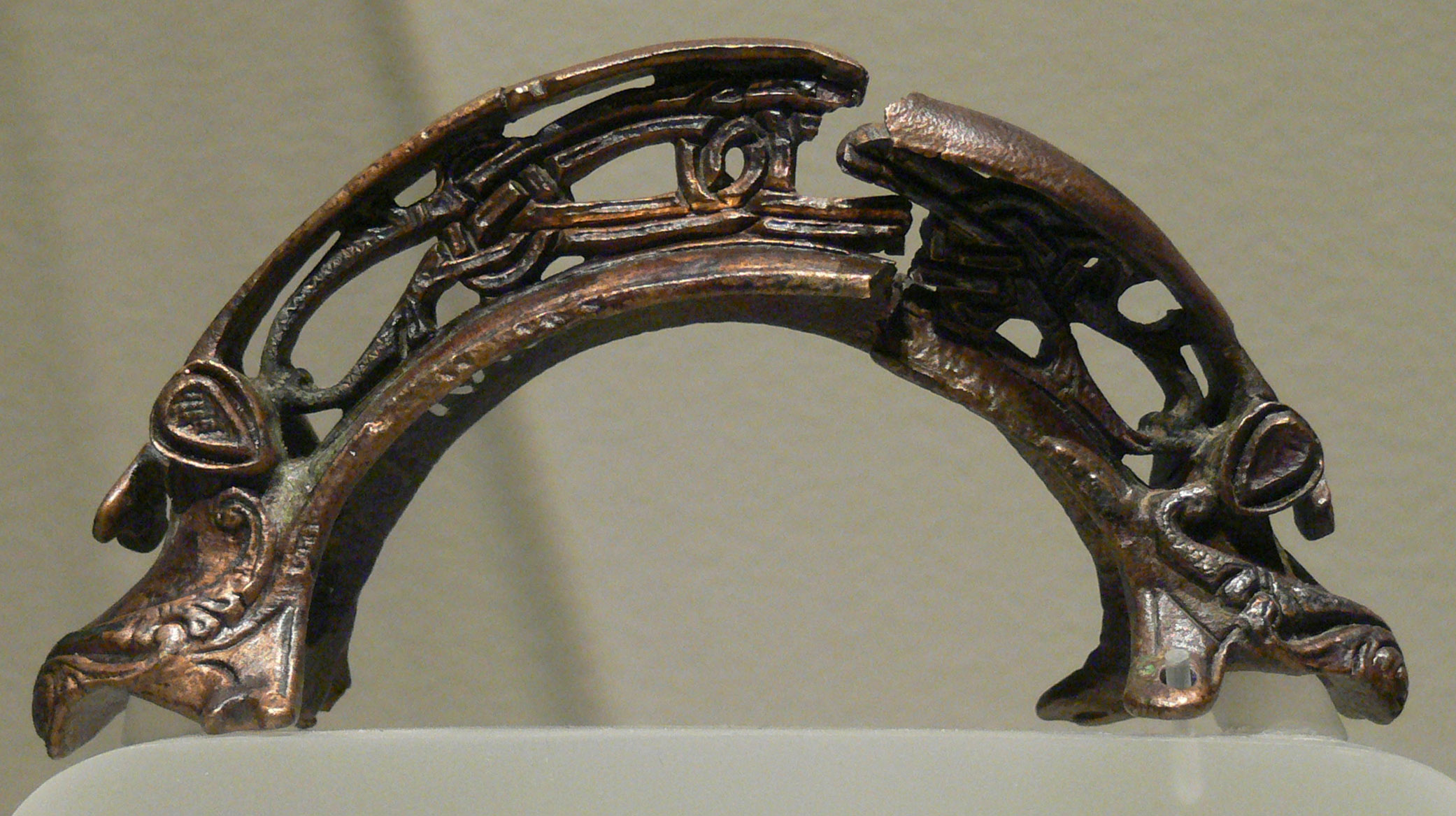
Crest fragment of a reliquary for a bronze bell, Musée de Cluny, Paris

A second period of enshrinement lasted from the early 14th to late 15th centuries, when the earlier reliquaries were heavily reworked or refurbished; thus many of these objects are said to have been built in two phases. Shrines from the second phase were often commissioned by secular owners who used their prestige to reinforce personal loyalty from a local bishop as insurers of treaties or contracts and to grant authority for tax collection.

Of the nineteen surviving Insular bell shrines, fifteen are Irish, three are Scottish, and one is English. Twelve are associated with a particular saint, in the other cases the identity of the saint is lost. It is assumed that by the time the bells were enshrined, they were already venerated relics; there is no contemporary mention or documentation as to why or by whom they were commissioned or constructed; apart from brief inscriptions on three intact shrines and one crest fragment. Although some sources expect that they were commissioned by high-kings for abbeys, the art-historian Karen Overbey observes that the lack of documentary evidence means the objects cannot be contextualized "nor located in secular and ecclesiastical politics".

== Characteristics ==
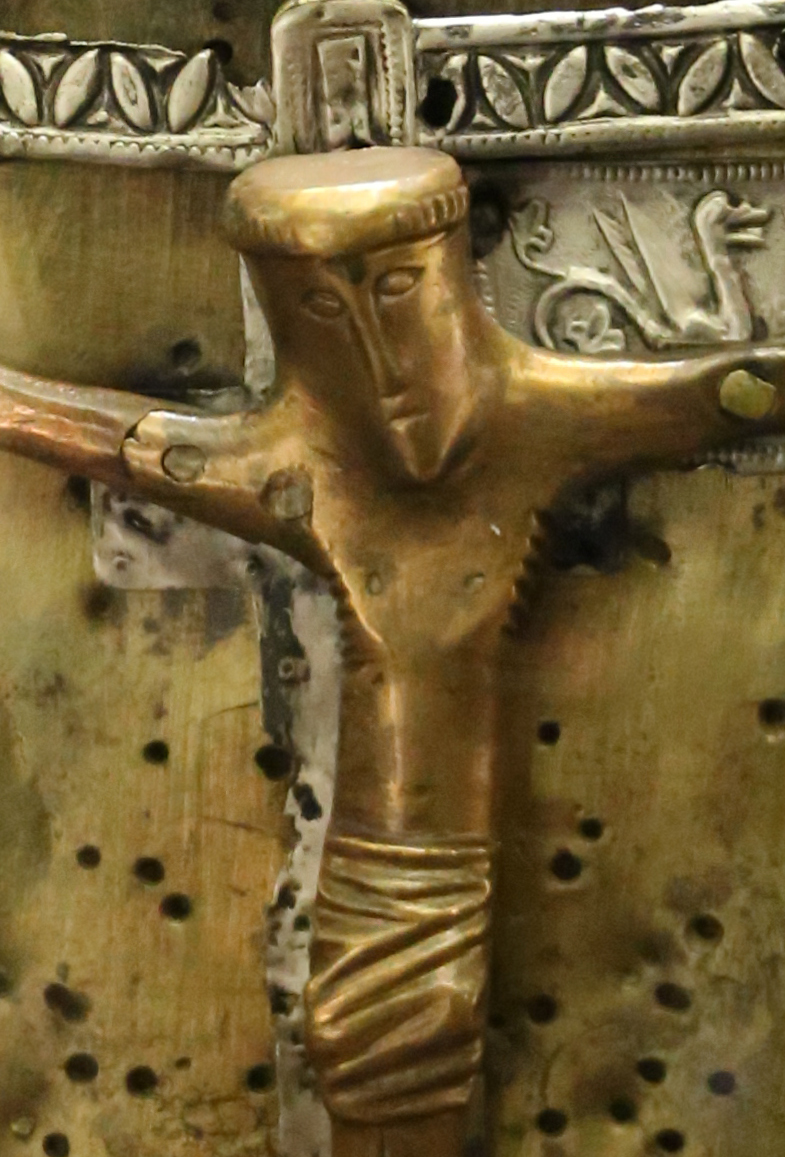
Christ with closed eyes, drooping head and rigid body on the front plate of the Corp Naomh (15th century)

The shrines retain the tapered quadrilateral shape of hand-bells. Their basic shape is constructed with a number of iron or bronze plates: four on the sides and one covering the base. The plates are typically richly decorated with materials such as silver, rock crystal, and niello. It is thought that this decoration occurred on flat sheets after the panels were cast, but before they were assembled.

Their front plates typically contain a large central cross added in their second, late medieval phase, although some of these are lost. Where the Christ figure does survive, it is often outsized compared to his cross and shows a figure that is obviously dead, with a drooping head and rigid body. According to Overbey, such foregrounds emphasise the role of "monastic prayer as powerfully apotropaic, even salvific...holy relics are simultaneously safeguarded and defensive; the saints and their guardians, whether angelic or monastic, protect each other".

Although four examples are missing their bells, those bells that survive are made of iron: iron bells were no longer being produced by the end of the 10th century, while bronze bells were later and continued to be made into the 12th century, thus making them less likely to have an association with an early Irish saint. A number of surviving iron bells contain rivets or rivet holes, indicating that they were once enshrined.

The shrines usually have handles or brackets on the short sides. These would have held straps or bronze chains as the shrines were intended to be carried around the shoulder for display at procession, pilgrimage or at battle. The wire chain for the Scottish Bell shrine of Kilmichael survives and is 1,070 cm (420 in) long and made from series of s-curved links.

== Selected examples ==
The better-known bell shrines include the Shrine of St. Patrick's Bell (c. 1094–1105), the badly damaged Corp Naomh (cap and crest 10th century; front and back panels 15th century), the Bell Shrine of St. Cuileáin (11th or 12th century) and the Bell Shrine of St. Conall Cael (15th century). From its inscriptions, it is known that Patrick's shrine was commissioned after 1091 by the Uí Néill High King Domnall Ua Lochlainn, and donated to the Bishop of Armagh. It is the earliest known example and is believed by Bourke to have been the innovation on which all later examples were based.

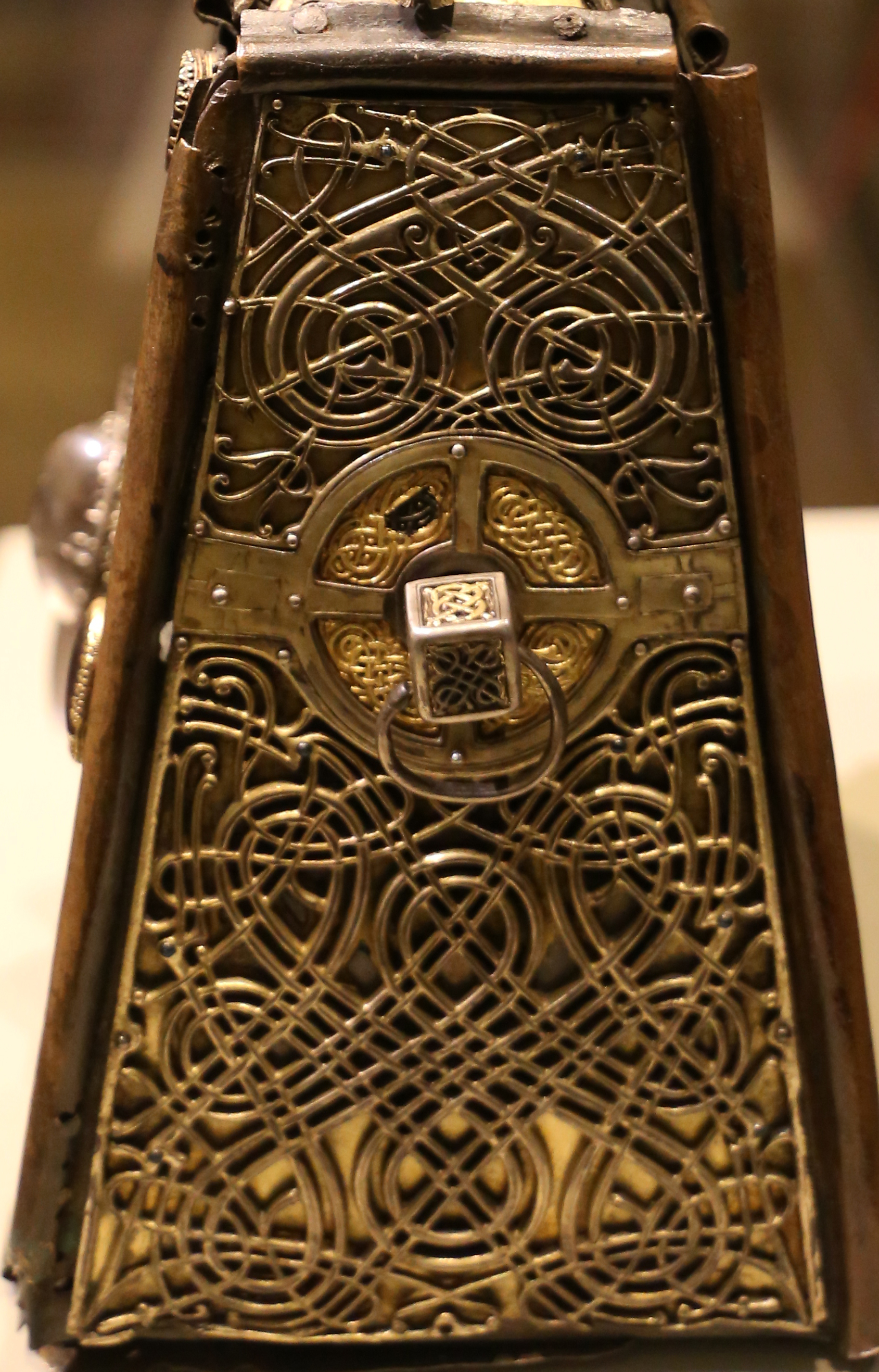
Interlace patterns on the left side of St. Patrick's Bell Shrine: the earliest, most elaborate and best preserved surviving example of the type. National Museum of Ireland (NMI).

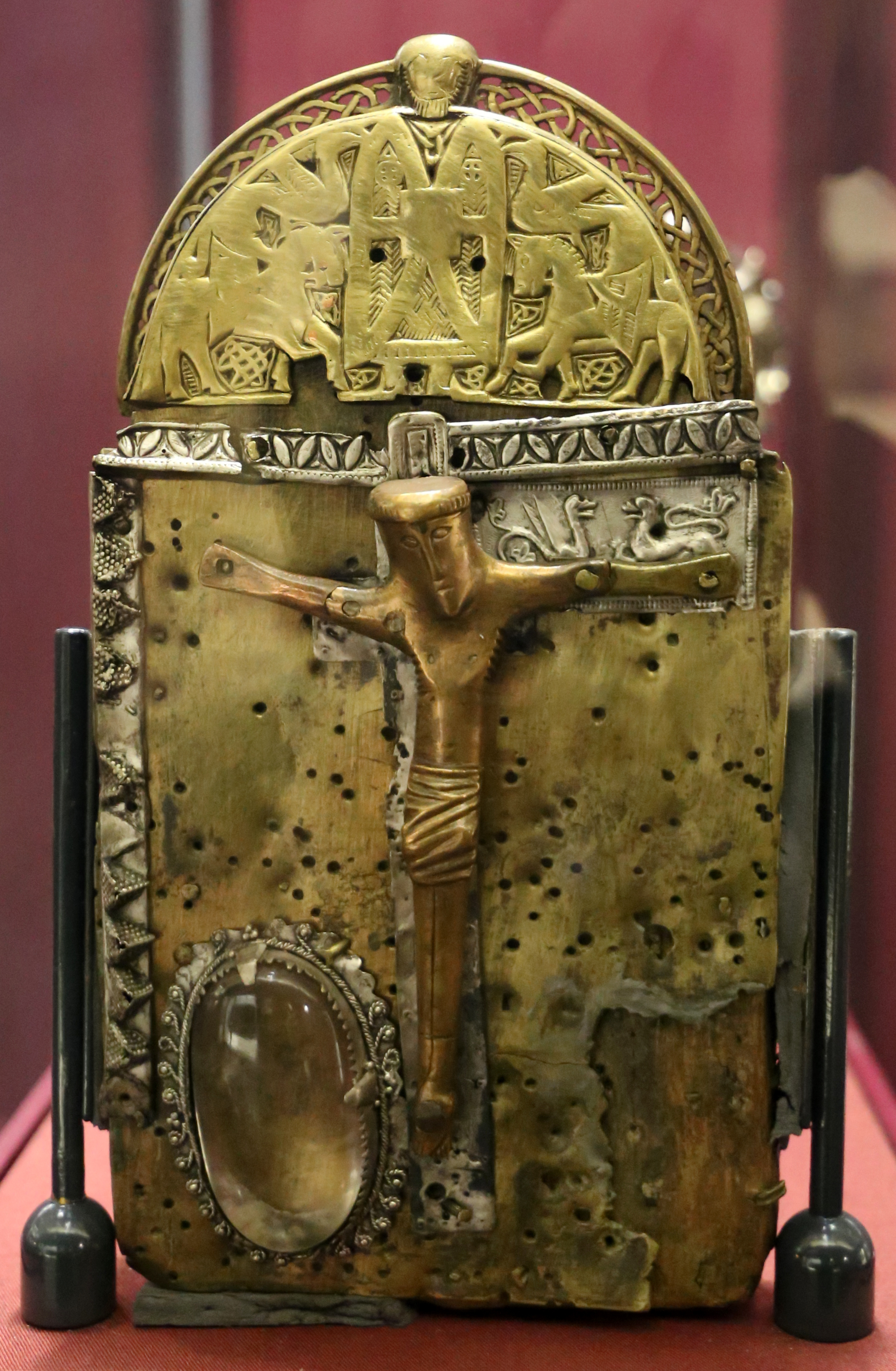
The Corp Naomh (Holy or Sacred Body). The original bell is lost, as is the identity of the associated saint. NMI.

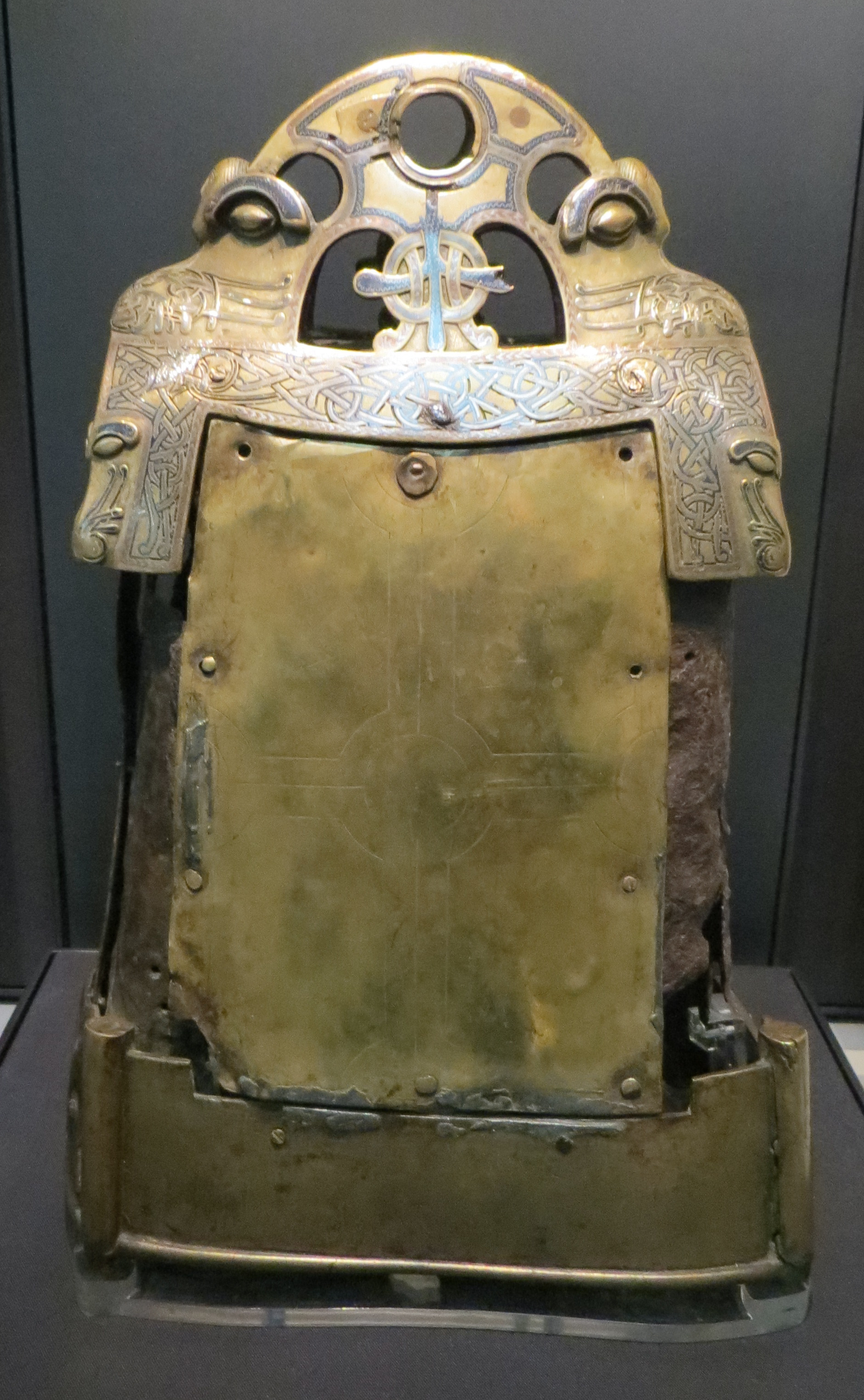
Bell Shrine of St. Cuileáin. While the structure is intact, most of the decorative panels are lost. British Museum (BM).

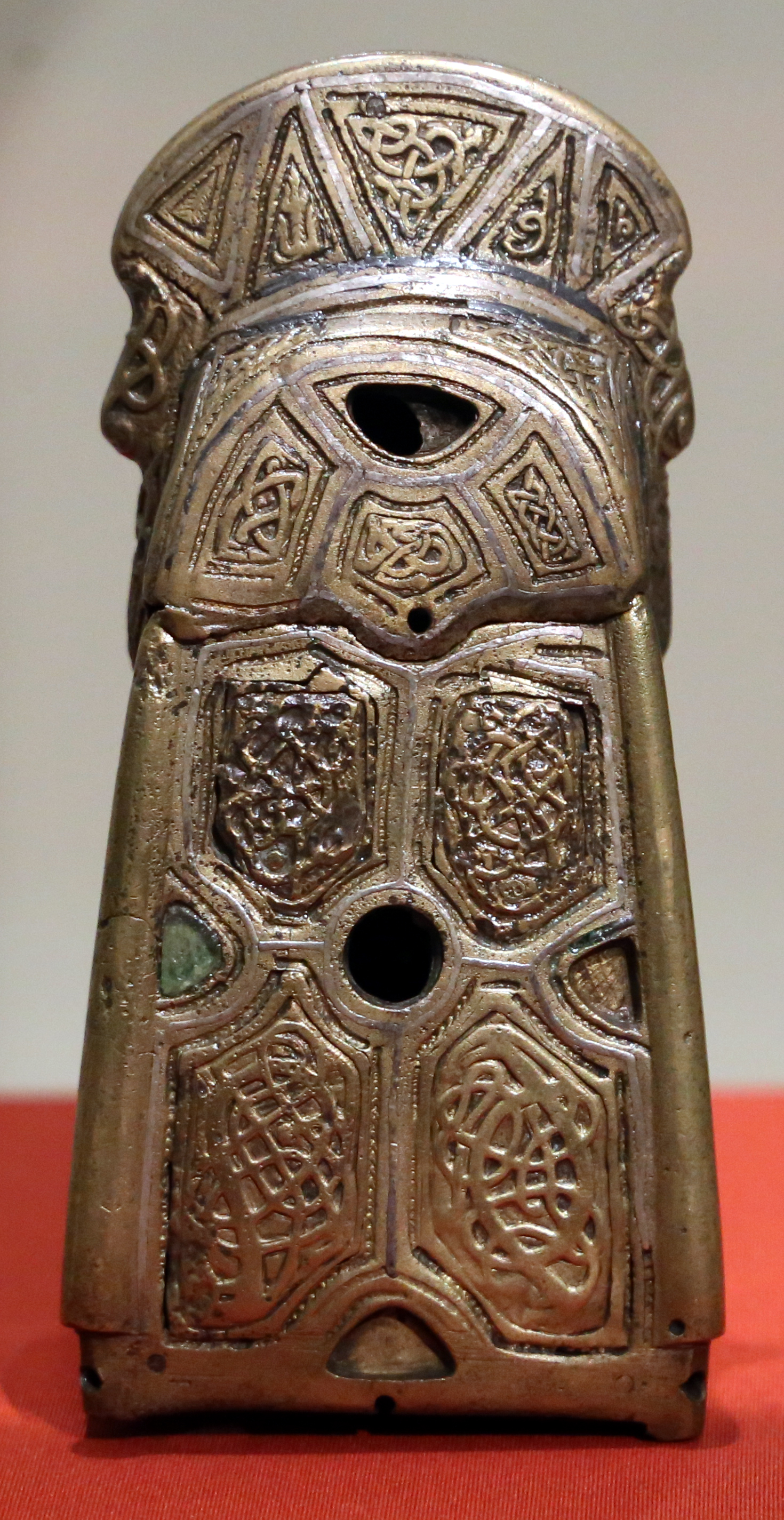
Shrine of St. Senan's Bell or the Clogán Óir, 11th or 12th century, NMI. Associated with Senán mac Geirrcinn and Inis Cathaigh

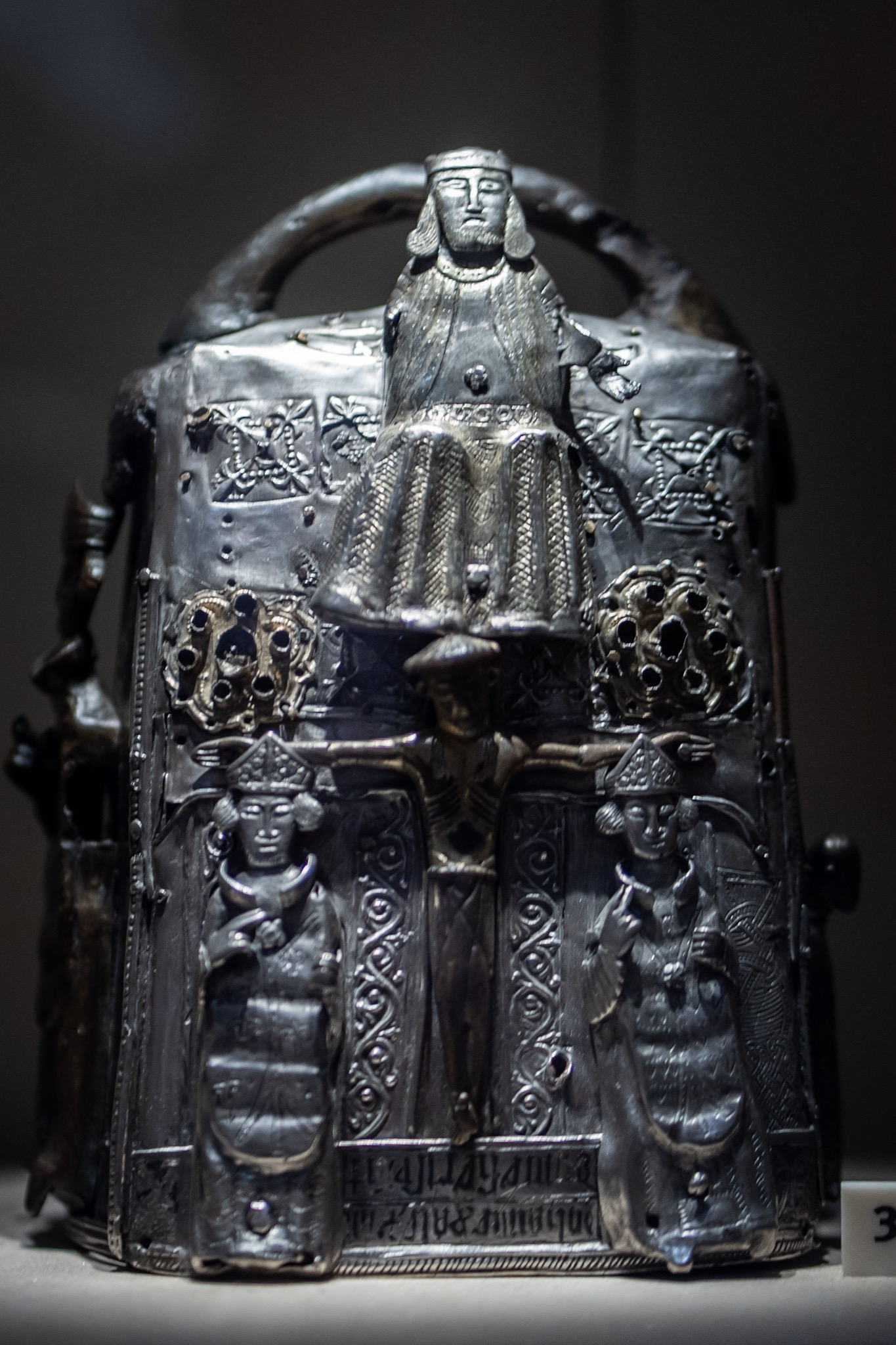
The Guthrie Bell Shrine, 12th century. National Museum of Scotland (NMS). The saint associated with this shrine is unknown.

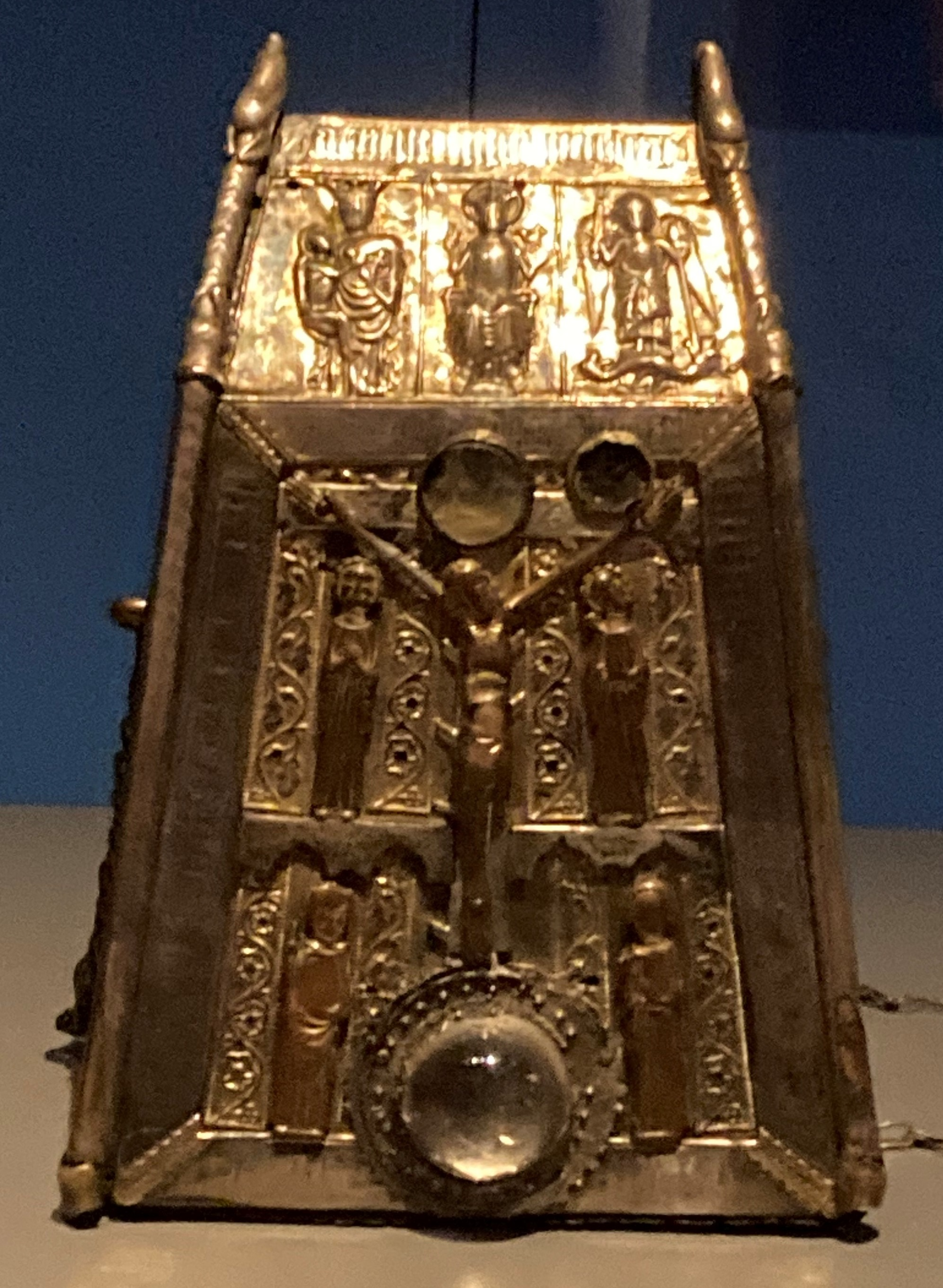
Bell Shrine of Conall Cael. The bell is 6th century. Although the shrine was initiated in the 12th century it underwent a major reworking in the 15th century. British Museum.

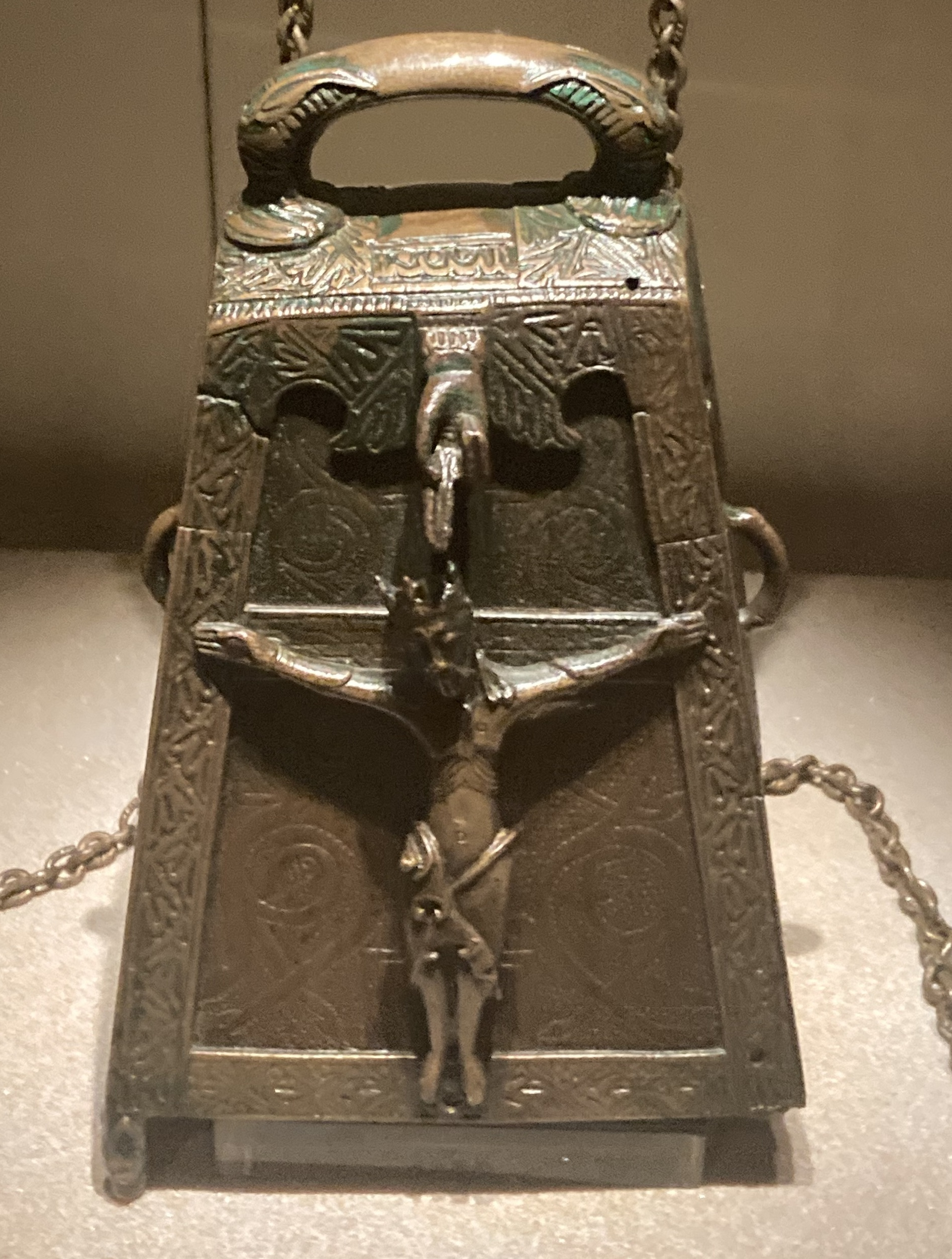
Bell shrine of Kilmichael, 12th century, encasing a 7th–9th century bell possibly associated with Colmcille, NMS

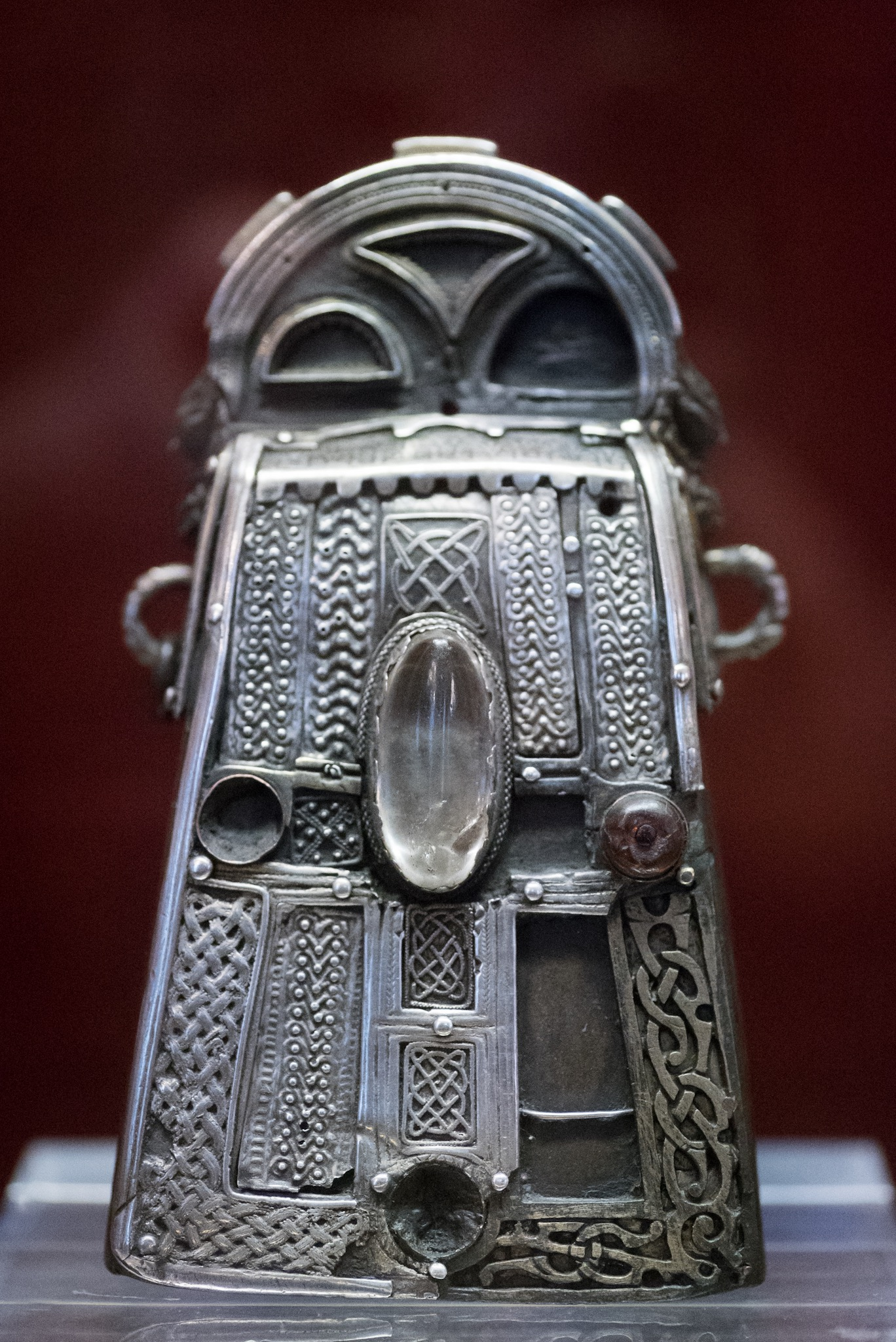
Bell Shrine of St. Mura, 11th century. Reputed to have come from the Abbey of Fahan, County Donegal, Ireland, where Saint Mura (c. 550–645) was the first abbot. Now in the Wallace Collection, London.
