= Hereditary keeper =

Hereditary keepers (known as Deòradh in Scottish Gaelic) were lay individuals or families tasked over generations with the long-term, usually multi-generational, guardianship of historically significant holy objects such as or relics or their reliquaries. Most of the artefacts dated from the early medieval period and include book shrines, Bell shrines, Celtic brooches, croziers and manuscripts.

The practice was especially prevalent in Ireland from the 13th century through to the early modern period. It came about following the late 12th century Anglo-Norman invasion of Ireland, when the Irish Church was suppressed and many objects were buried in fields or bogs, or hidden on church grounds to protect them from plunder or destruction.

The tradition in Scotland had a key difference: deòradh were "officially charged" with the custody of a relic, and thus were given episcopal authority for various duties, most commonly in settling disputes or collecting fees.

== Origins and practice ==
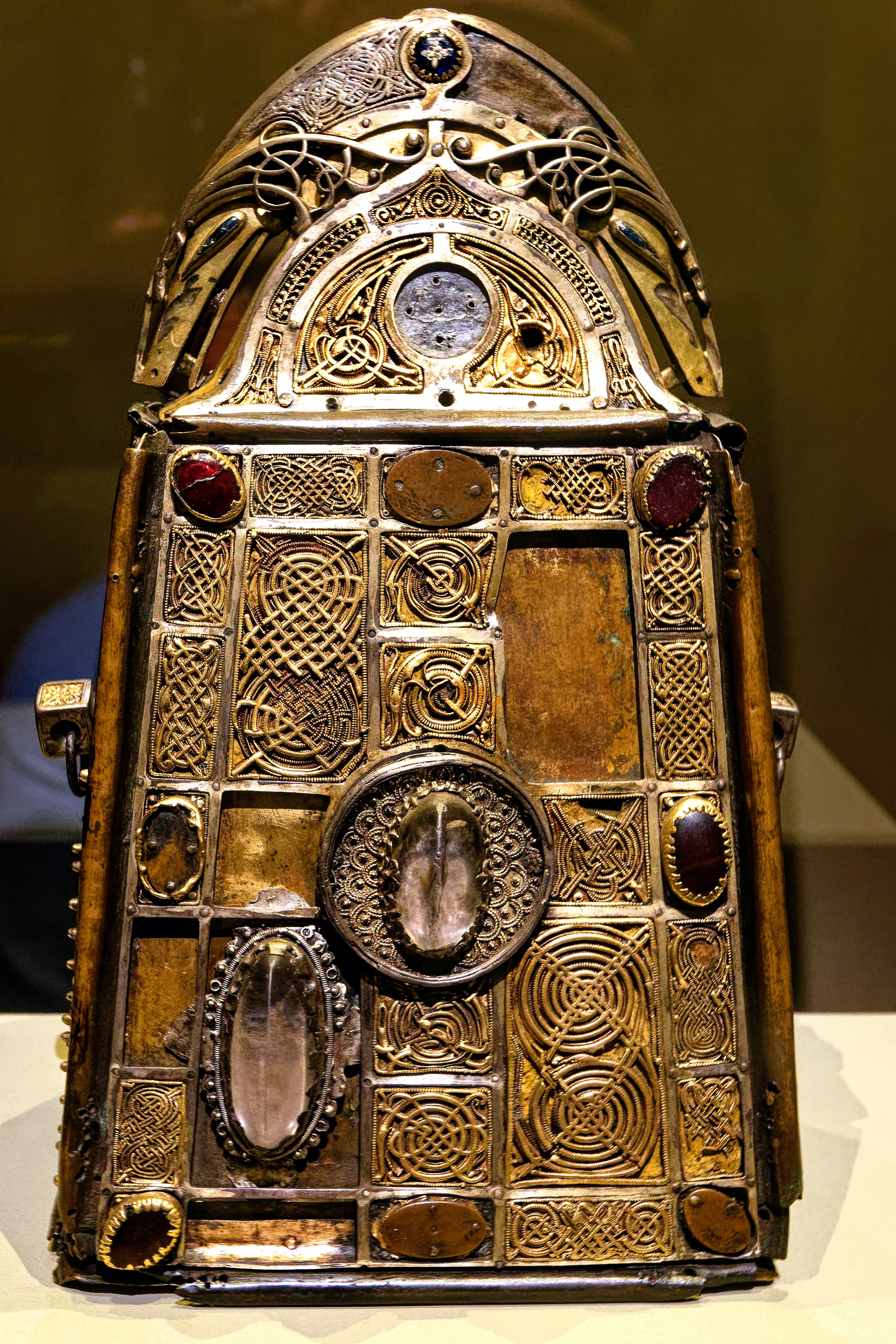
The Shrine of St. Patrick's Bell kept by the Ó Maellchallain family until th early 19th century. Now in the NMI.

According to Raghnall Ó Floinn, former director of the National Museum of Ireland (NMI), "There were families who were entrusted with relics from the Middle Ages and the time of the Reformation. Because there was no official Catholic Church in Ireland, many relics were damaged or destroyed at the time, while others hidden or entrusted to families were passed down from generation to generation. There are a couple we can trace back from the 19th century to the 12th century, such as St Patrick's Bell."

In Scotland, a deòradh was officially appointed and given the insignia of office. The individual hereditary family member thus had ecclesiastical authority and could practice duties such as settling disputes or enforcing laws, cursing or blessing, witnessing the swearing of oaths, protecting the dead or dying or even the collection of tributes or fees.

Most significantly, reliquaries were often used as battle standards in medieval Ireland and Scotland, with expectation that they would boost troop morale or aid victory. Typically the relics would carried onto the battlefield by a cleric, who would often be employed by the family as its hereditary custodian. The most well-known cumdach used for this purpose is the Cathach of St. Columba used as a battle talisman by the O'Donnell family.

== Decline ==
The practice declined from the mid-19th century, in part because general impoverishment and major events such as the Great Famine forced families into selling their artefacts. At the same time antiquarians and museums sought out and acquired the objects for their own collections or for re-selling. In Ireland, the Royal Irish Academy was very active in seeking out such objects to preserve them for the nation. The entire collection was transferred to the NMI on its foundation in 1890.

== Notable objects held by hereditary keepers ==
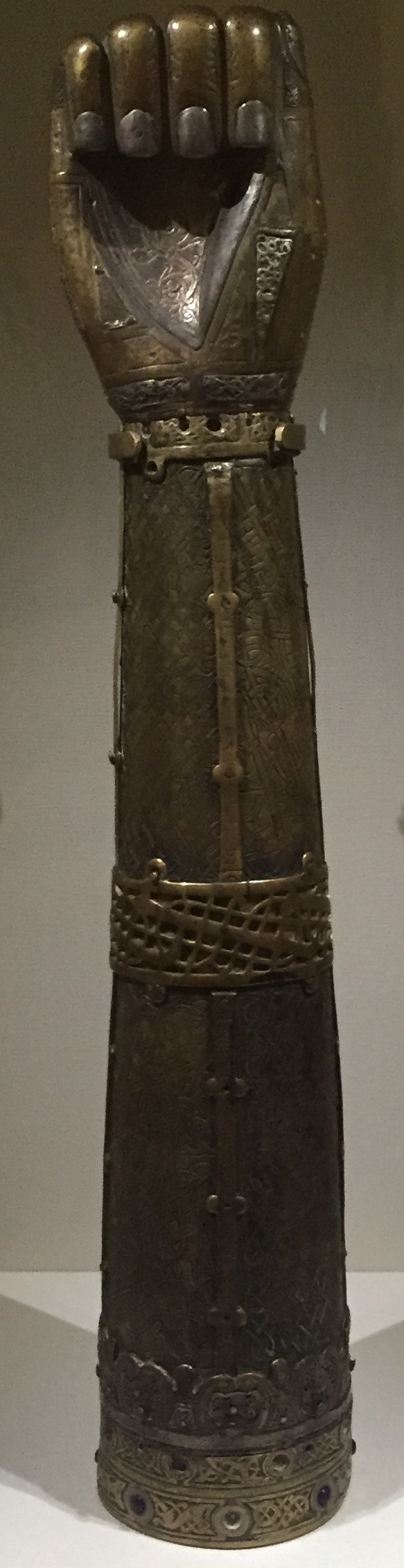
Shrine of Saint Lachtin's Arm, c. 1120

- St. Columba's Crozier, Irish 8th or 9th century, the Mac Geoghegan family until the mid-19th century.
- The Coigreach, Scottish 8th & 13th century, the Dewars of Glendochart.
- Shrine of St. Patrick's Bell, Irish c. 1100, the Ó Maellchallain family.
- Soiscél Molaisse, Irish, 11th century, the O'Meehan family for c. 500 years.
- Shrine of Saint Lachtin's Arm, Irish c. 1120, the Healy family until before the 18th century.
- Shrine of St. Senan's Bell, Irish, the O'Keane family until 1730, then the MacCahan family until the late-19th century
- Breac Maodhóg, Irish, 11th century, held by the O’Reilly lords of East Bréifne.

== Sources ==
- Bourke, Cormac. The Early Medieval Handbells of Ireland and Britain. Dublin: Wordwell Press, 2020. ISBN 978-0-9017-7788-1
- Joynt, M. "The Cathach of St. Columba". The Irish Church Quarterly, volume 10, number 39, 1917. JSTOR 30067688
- Lacey, Brian. Manus O'Donnell's 'Life of Colum Cille'. Dublin: Four Courts Press, 1998. ISBN 978-1-8518-2394-9
- Lucas, Anthony. "The Social Role of Relics and Reliquaries in Ancient Ireland". The Journal of the Royal Society of Antiquaries of Ireland, volume 116, 1986. JSTOR 25508904
- Moss, Rachell. Medieval c. 400—c. 1600: Art and Architecture of Ireland. London: Yale University Press, 2014. ISBN 978-0-3001-7919-4
- Ó Floinn, Raghnal; Wallace, Patrick. Treasures of the National Museum of Ireland: Irish Antiquities. Dublin: National Museum of Ireland, 2002. ISBN 978-0-7171-2829-7
- Overbey, Karen. Sacral Geographies: Saints, Shrines and Territory in Medieval Ireland. Turnhout: Brepols, 2012. ISBN 978-2-503-52767-3
