= Cormac Bourke =

Irish archeologist

Cormac Bourke (born in Dublin) is an Irish archeologist specialising in Medieval studies, early church history and insular Christianity. He is a former, long term, curator of Medieval Antiquities at the Ulster Museum, Belfast, and currently works at the antiquities department of the National Museum of Ireland.

His publications focus on early medieval Irish metalwork and the archaeology of saint's relics, and range from surveys of early Irish hand-bells, to Insular croziers, Celtic brooches, crucifixion plaques and cumdachs.

Describing his widely praised 2022 book, The Early Medieval Hand-bells of Ireland and Britain, on a topic that was relatively under-studied, the National Museum of Ireland wrote that the "breadth of research undertaken, and extraordinary level of detail and description provided throughout...make it the most authoritative study ever undertaken on medieval hand-bells...[and] an immense achievement both nationally and internationally."

== Selected publications ==
=== Books ===
- The Early Medieval Hand-bells of Ireland and Britain. Dublin: Wordwell, 2022. ISBN 978-0-9017-7788-1
- "Bell-Shrines". In: Moss, Rachel (ed.). Medieval c. 400—c. 1600: Art and Architecture of Ireland. London: Yale University Press, 2014. ISBN 978-0-3001-7919-4
- Studies in the Cult of Saint Columba, Dublin: Four Courts Press, 1997. ISBN 978-1-8518-2313-0
- Patrick: The Archaeology of a Saint. Stationery Office Books, 1993. ISBN 978-0-3370-8311-2.

=== Articles ===
- "The Prosperous, Co. Kildare, Crozier: archaeology and use". Proceedings of the Royal Irish Academy: Archaeology, Culture, History, Literature, volume 117C, 2017
- "St Mel's Cathedral fire". Archaeology Ireland, volume 24, no. 1, Spring 2010.
- "The "Domnach Airgid" in 2006". Clogher Record, volume 19, No. 1, 2006. JSTOR 20492001
- "The Shrine of St. Patrick's Hand". Irish Arts Review (1984-1987), volume 4, no. 3, Autumn, 1987. JSTOR 20492001
- "A panel on the north cross at Clonmacnoise". Journal of the Royal Historical and Archaeological Association of Ireland. Journal of the Royal Society of Antiquaries of Ireland, volume 116, 1986. JSTOR 25508909
- "A Crozier and Bell from Inishmurray and Their Place in Ninth-Century Irish Archaeology". Proceedings of the Royal Irish Academy: Archaeology, Culture, History, Literature. Dublin: Royal Irish Academy, volume 85C, 1985. JSTOR 25506128
- "Early Irish Hand-Bells". The Journal of the Royal Society of Antiquaries of Ireland, volume 110, 1980. JSTOR 25508775
