= Crucifixion plaque =

Crucifixion sculptures with ancillary panels

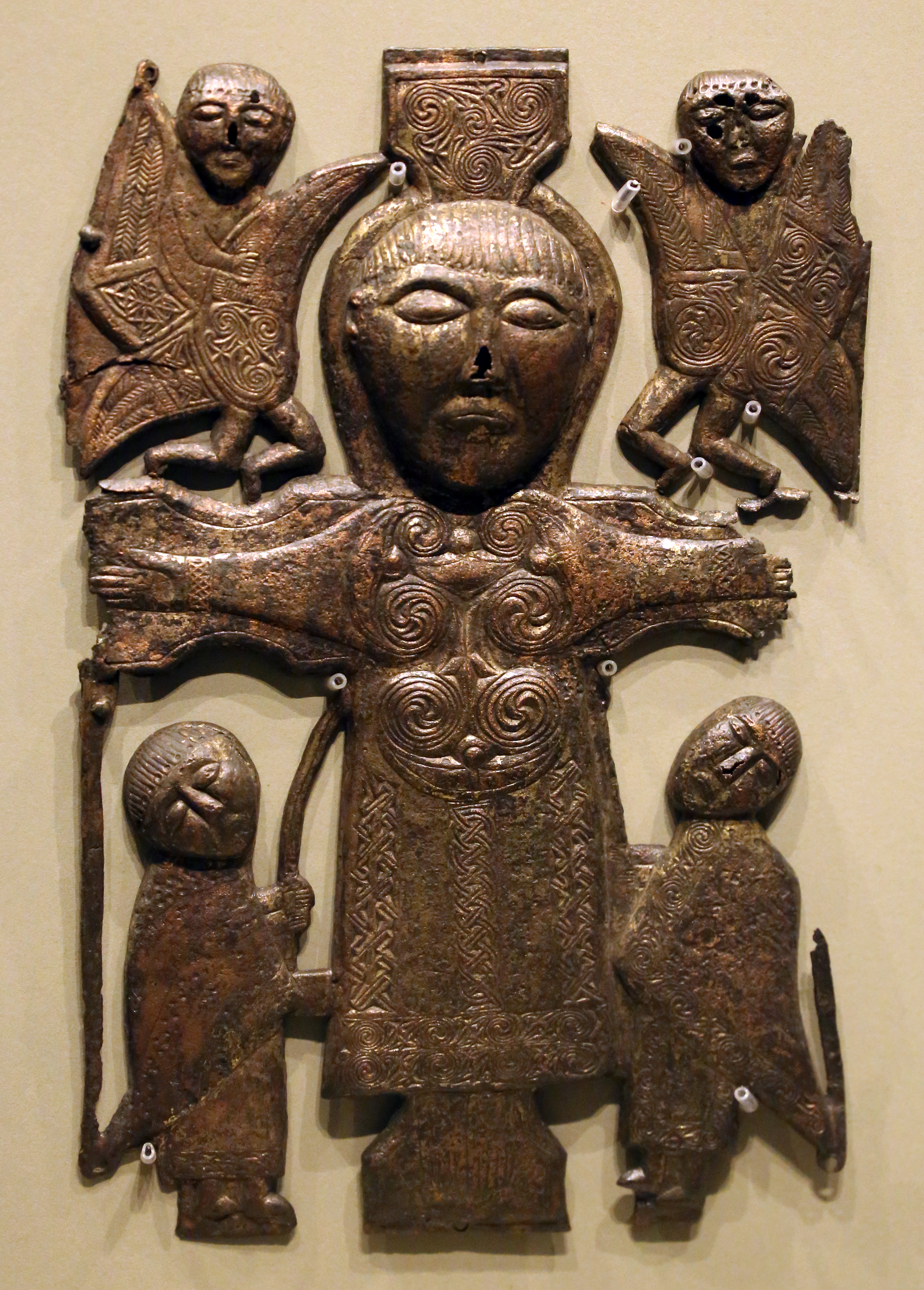
Athlone Crucifixion Plaque, late 7th or early 8th century

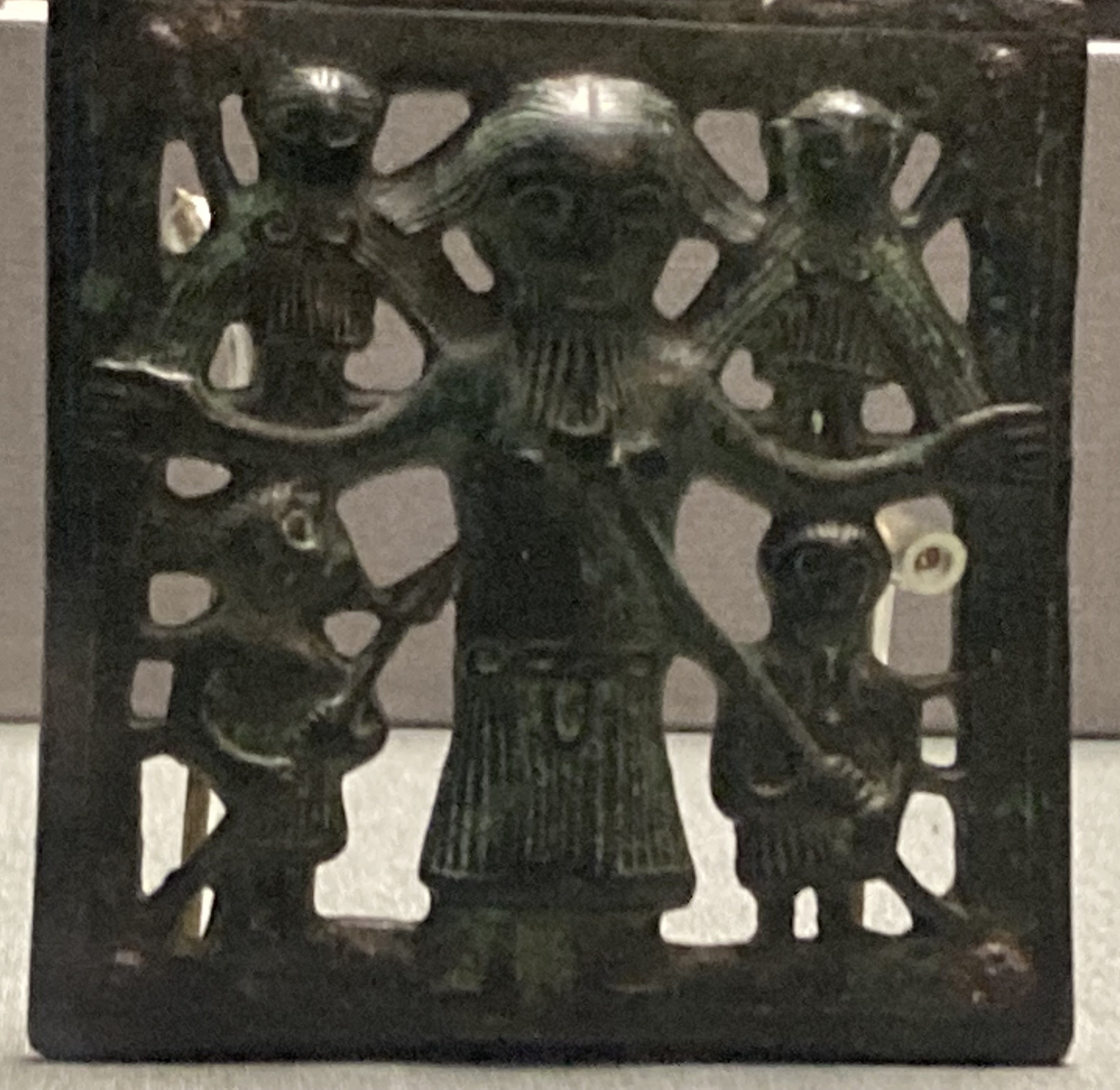
Killalo Crucifixion Plaque, 11th century

Crucifixion plaques are a type of Irish Early Medieval metal sculpture consisting of a central panel of the still alive but crucified Jesus, surrounded by four ancillary panels. The lower quadrants show Stephaton and Longinus (the lance and sponge bearers) and two hovering attendant angels in the upper quadrants. The frames have cavities that once held nails or rivets, indicating that the plaques were intended as attachments to larger ecclesiastical objects, perhaps book shrines, processional crosses or altarpieces.

Alongside high crosses, the plaques are among the earliest known examples of both figuration and representation of the Crucifixion in Insular art. Eight of the nine known examples survive, although many more would have been produced. All were found in Ireland in the 19th and 20th centuries; presumably they would have been hidden by Irish clerics from Viking or Norman invaders. They are all made from cast bronze and are similar in size. Apart from one, they of openwork (ie the figures were formed from holes or gaps punched through the metal). They were found within a relatively small geographical area, with find spots ranging from the area between Clonmacnoise in County Offaly and Tynan, County Armagh. The plaques are all cast as single pieces and except for the early 8th century Athlone and the Lismore plaques, have a unifying border.

Based on their ornamentation and iconography, apart from the very early Athlone plaque, archaeologists dated them to the late 10th to early 12th centuries. Their format and iconography are based on designs found in classical Roman sculpture and in miniatures in 8th and 9th century illuminated manuscripts including the Book of Kells and Southampton Psalter.

== Surviving examples ==
The following list of the nine known plaques is based on the titles, locations and dates established by the archaeologist Peter Harbison in 1980, refined and updated by the archaeologists Ruth Johnson in 1998 and Griffin Murray in 2014.

1. The Rinnegan (or Athole, or St. John's) Crucifixion Plaque, Rinnagan, near Athlone, late 7th or early 8th century. National Museum of Ireland (NMI), Dublin
2. The County Mayo Plaque (lost)
3. The Tynan Crucifixion Plaque, County Armagh, c. 1100. NMI
4. The Clonmacnoise Crucifixion Plaque, County Offaly, late–10th or early–11th century. NMI
5. The Anketell Plaque, County Monaghan. NMI
6. The Killaloe Plaque, County Clare, 11th century. NMI.
7. Irish, no locality
8. The Lismore Plaque, County Waterford, c. 1090–1113. NMI
9. The Kells Plaque, County Kilkenny, 11th or 12th century. British Museum

== Format and iconography ==
Most of the plaques are made from bronze and with the figures achieved through openwork. They are decorated on the front side only, indicating they were intended to be attached to larger ecclesiastical objects. The very early and larger Rinnegan plaque shows evidence of now lost gilding. Apart from the Rinnegan plaque, they are all square-shaped and measure approximately 99 mm (3.9 in) x 99 mm (3.9 in).

The plaques consist of a central panel depicting the crucified Jesus on a cross within a square frame or border. He is surrounded by figures on each of the four surrounding quadrants. The upper two contain winged angels above his shoulders, the lower ones have the biblical figures Stephaton (the sponge-bearer) and Longinus (the lance-bearer) at either side of his feet. The ancillary figures assume various positions and poses in the different examples. The angels can be depicted as standing, hovering, or having two or three wings, while the soldiers can be shown standing or kneeling, on different sides, or adorned with different types of Celtic patterns. The Clonmacnoise plaque has a small cross on either side of Christ's head.

As with contemporaneous depictions of the Crucifixion on early medieval high crosses, Christ is depicted on a much larger scale than the other figures. He is usually bearded and has large, open eyes, indicating he is still alive. Christ wears a loincloth in six examples, and a full-length long-sleeved tunic in the Rinnegan and Clonmacnoise plaques. Apart from the Clonmacnoise plaque, his feet are turned away from each other.

The figures and frames are elaborately decorated with Ultimate La Tène, Insular and 11th-century Viking Ringerike designs, including spirals, interlace, foliate and lozenge patterns. The Clonmacnoise plaque is described by the archaeologist Ruth Johnson as "the most elaborate of the group". The reverse panels are plain and unadorned. Many contain multiple rivet holes, some of which (including the Clonmacnoise plaque) still contain nails. The rivet holes indicate that they may once have been attached to larger metal or wooden including metal altar crosses such as the Tully Lough Cross, wooden altarpieces or metal book shrines (cumdachs).

== Dating ==
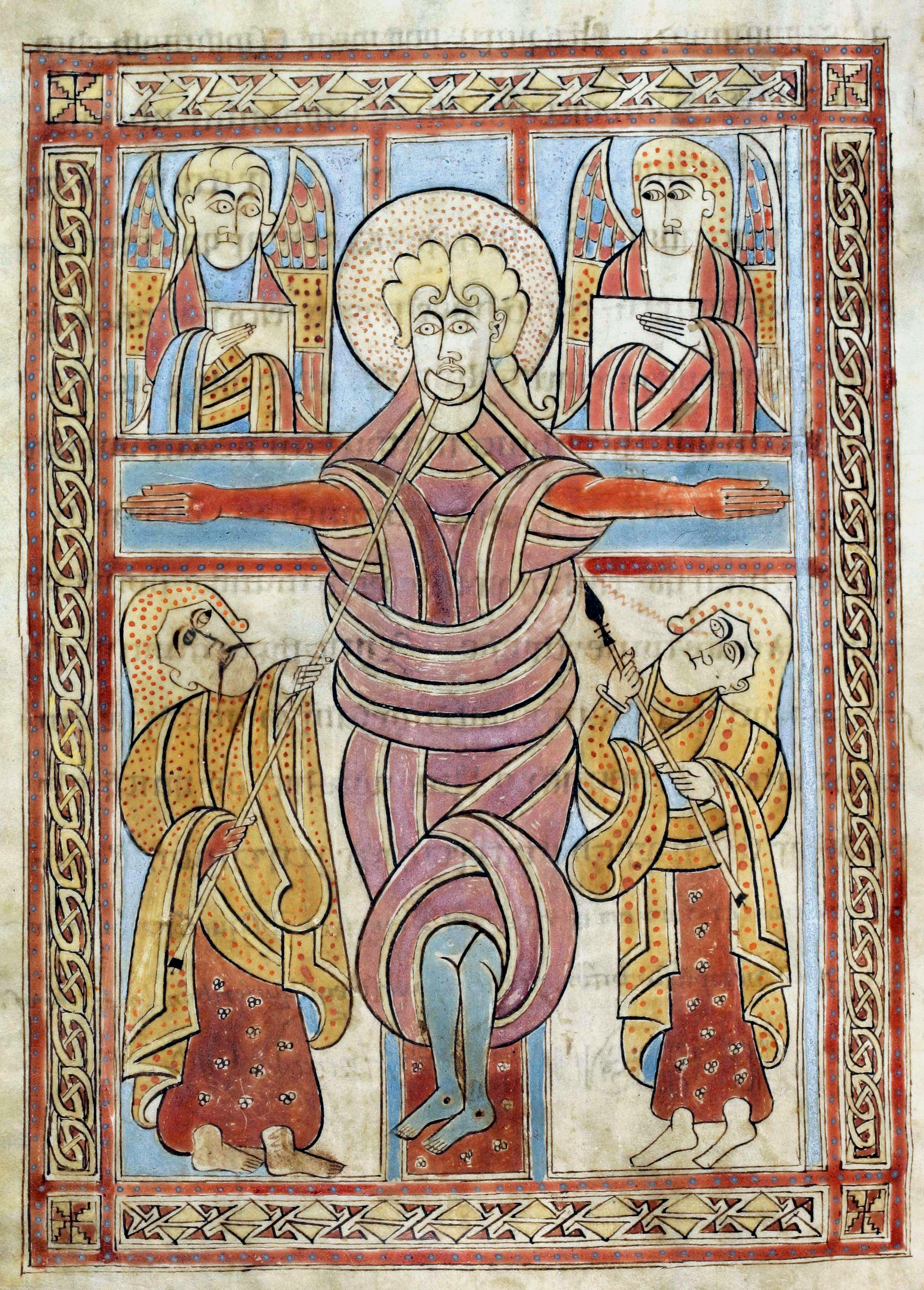
Folio 38fv, Southampton Psalter, c. 9th century

The surviving plaques were rediscovered in varying circumstances during the 19th and 20th centuries, having presumably been hidden to protect them from invading Vikings or Normans. Based on their iconography and lack of Viking-influenced animal or zoomorphic designs, the majority are dated to the late 11th and early 12th centuries, based on elements such as vegetative decorations reminiscent of the Ringerike style.

The late 7th- or 8th-century Rinnegan Crucifixion Plaque is at least two centuries older than the other examples. It is so dated by its use of curvilinear designs reminiscent of the late Celtic style.

The format of a crucified Christ surrounded by angels above each arm and soldiers below draws on earlier figurations in 7th- to 9th-century Insular illuminated gospels, to the extent that it seems likely that the craftsmen had copies of these works. Examples include f. 200r of the Book of Kells, f.38v from the Southampton Psalter, and miniatures from the Irish Gospels of St. Gall, the Durham Gospels, and the spear-bearer on a long-side from the c. 1026 cumdach for the Stowe Missal.

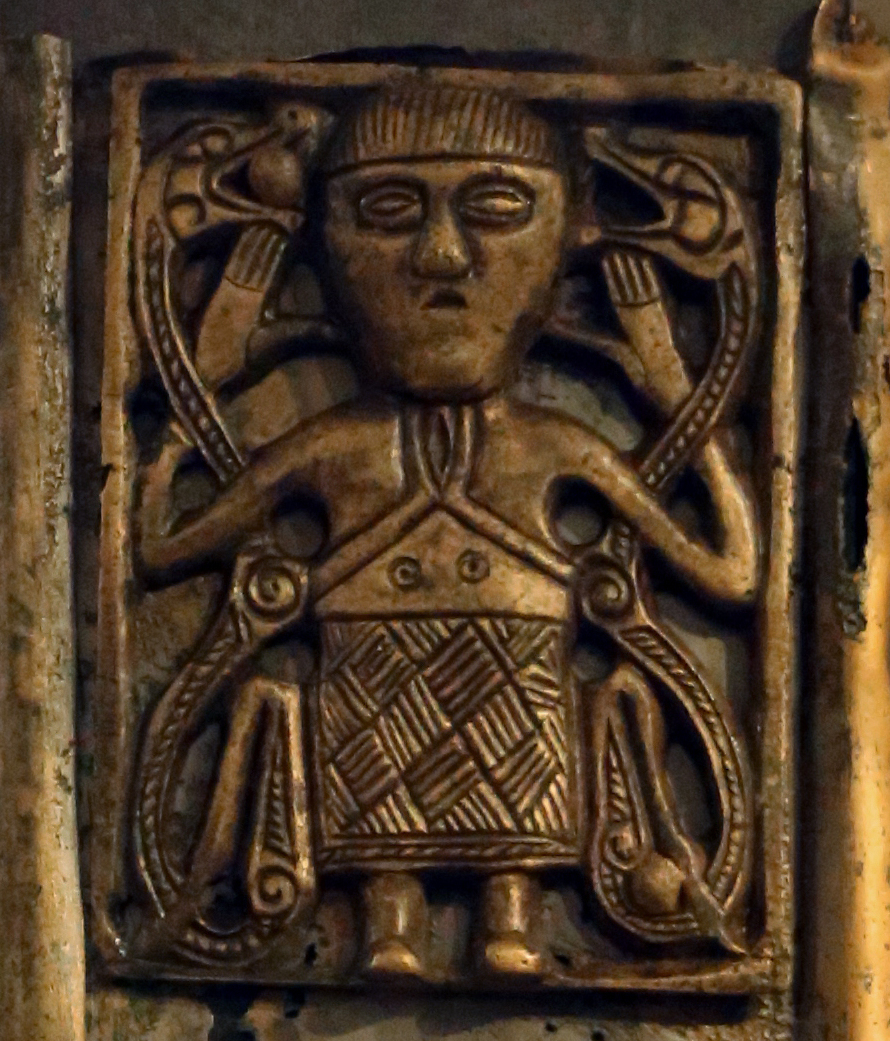
Panel on the upper arm of the 8th- or 9th-century Tully Lough Cross, NMI

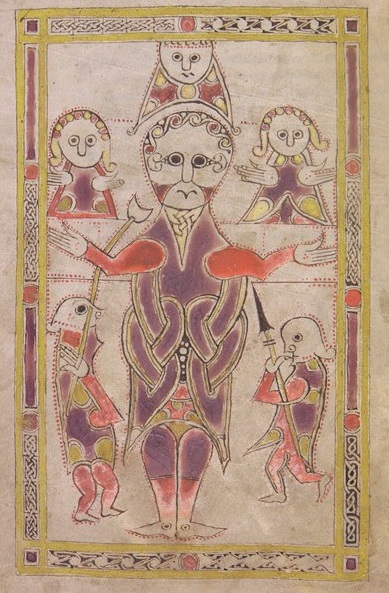
Southampton Psalter, f.38v; 9th century or after.

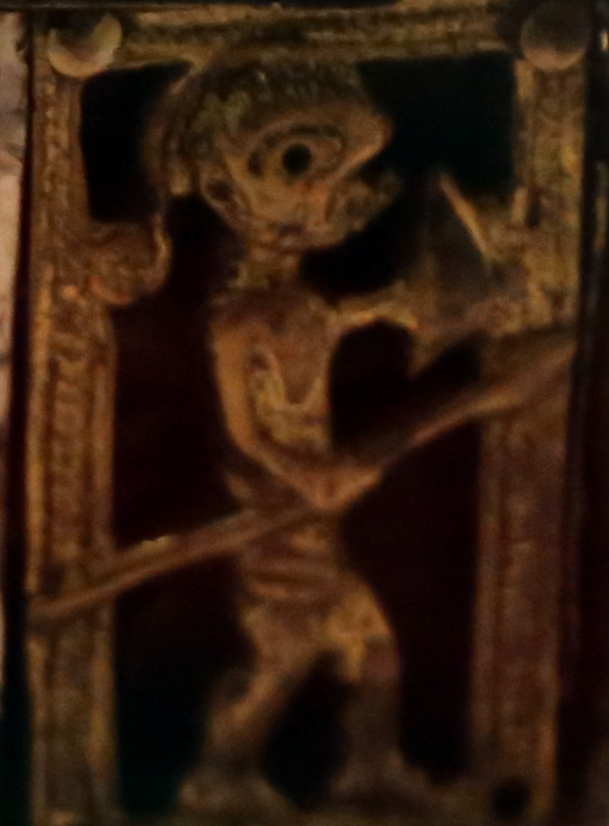
Detail from a side of the cumdach for the Stowe Missal, 11th century, NMI

== Function ==
Given that the plaques all have "original fixing holes" and are all of a similar size, archaeologists believe they were intended to decorate larger ecclesiastical objects. However, the specific type of object is unknown. Suggestions include wooden processional crosses, book shrines and altar frontals (antependiums). The number of similar mounds and inserts on contemporary or earlier altars and crosses supports this theory. A similarly sized mount is positioned on the lower part of the 8th or 9th century Tully Lough Cross, while similar compositions can be found on, amongst others, the Ullard cross in County Kilkenny, the Cross of St. Columba and St. Patrick at the Abbey of Kells, the South Cross at Clonmacnoise, and etchings on a stone cross on the Calf of Man.

NMI director Joseph Raftery (1941) and Harbison favoured the idea that they were used as pax-plates (objects used for the Kiss of peace during mass). Their conclusions were based mainly on the fact that the objects typically contain wear around Christ's head, perhaps indicating that they were passed around by the congregation for this area to be kissed. Murray disputes this theory; although pax-plates were used in later medieval mass ceremonies, there is no evidence of their use in early medieval Ireland.

Rafferty suggested that a single workshop produced the plaques, a theory refuted by Murray, who established both their relative geographical dispersion and differences when analysed under x-ray fluorescence.

== Groupings ==
In 1980, Harbison proposed the plaques as a distinct type. At the time, there were six known plaques which he grouped based on their iconography and form, including the pose of the biblical figures and angels, their borders and Christ's pose and clothing. He established that, except for the c. 800 AD Rinnegan plaque, they all dated to c. 1100 AD, while earlier archaeologists had argued that they dated from anywhere between the 9th and 12th centuries. Harbison divided the plaques into two broad groupings based on their find-spots and style, and argued that these examples originated from two individual workshops or traditions: in Clonmacnoise, County Offaly and in Dungannon, County Tyrone (in border counties around Northern Ireland).

Since Harbison's publication, the Dungannon Plaque is now localised to Tynan, County Armagh, near the find-spot of another plaque from Anketell, County Monaghan, while another example is now thought to originate from Lismore, County Waterford. Based on these findings, Murray further divided the plaques into the "Tynan", "Clonmacnoise", "Klllalon" (or "Kells") groups and "others" (i.e. those unlocalised either by find-spot or style, and the very early and geographically distinct Rinnegan Plaque).

=== Clonmacnoise ===
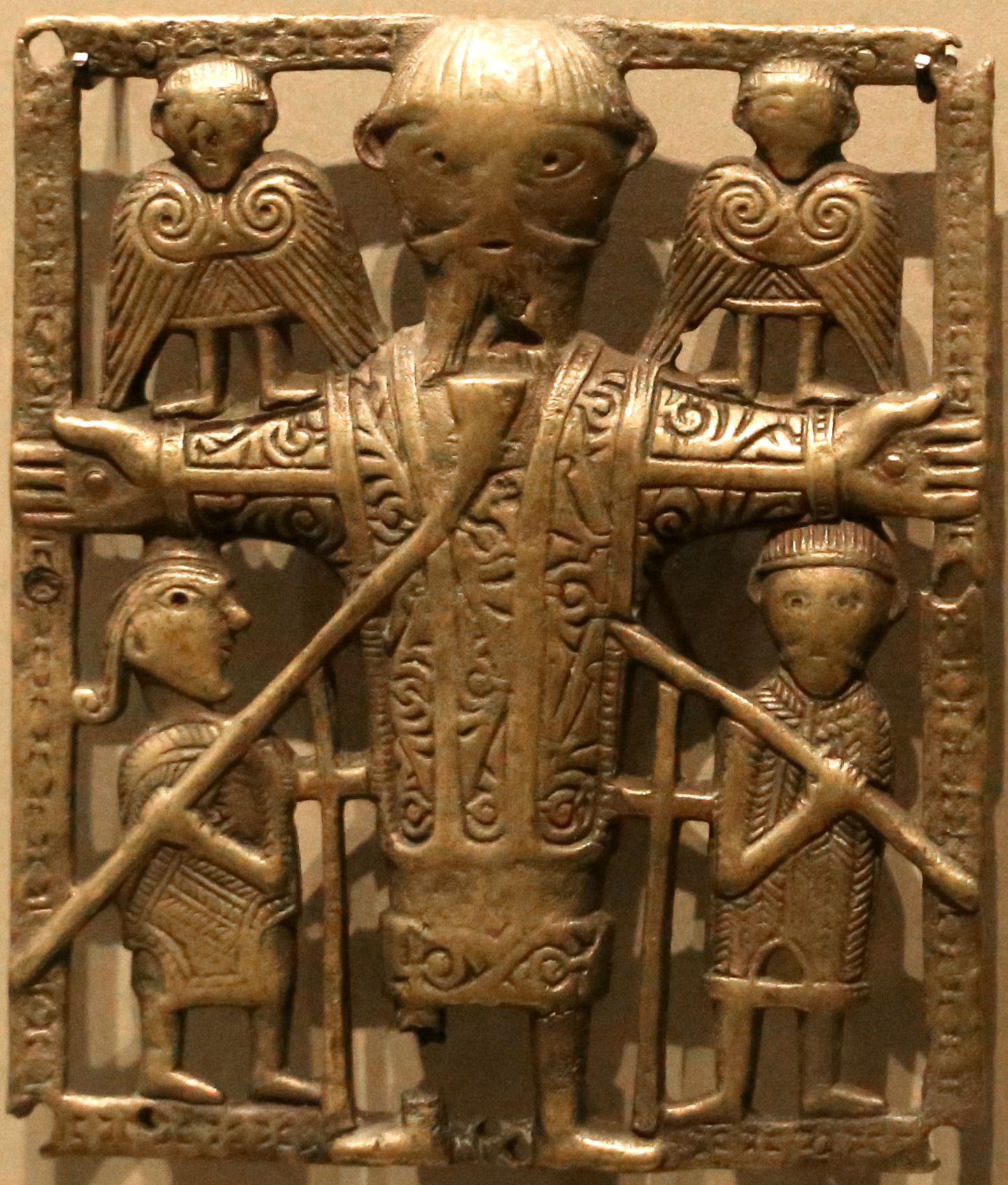
The Clonmacnoise Crucifixion Plaque, 10th or early-11th century. h: 8.0 cm (3.1 in)

Harbison placed three examples within the Clonmacnois group, based on stylistic proximity to the Clonmacnoise Crucifixion Plaque, which he believed to be the most accomplished of the extant Crucifixion plaques. That plaque takes its name from its find spot in the once important but now-ruined monastery Clonmacnoise, County Offaly. Based on similar iconography, technique and location, he associated it with both the now lost, so-called Mayo Plaque (today known only from a 1830's watercolour reproduction), and the unlocalised Academy Plaque. Assuming that all three were produced within a relatively narrow date range, Harbison speculated that they were created by a single workshop that also made the Clonmacnoise Crozier.

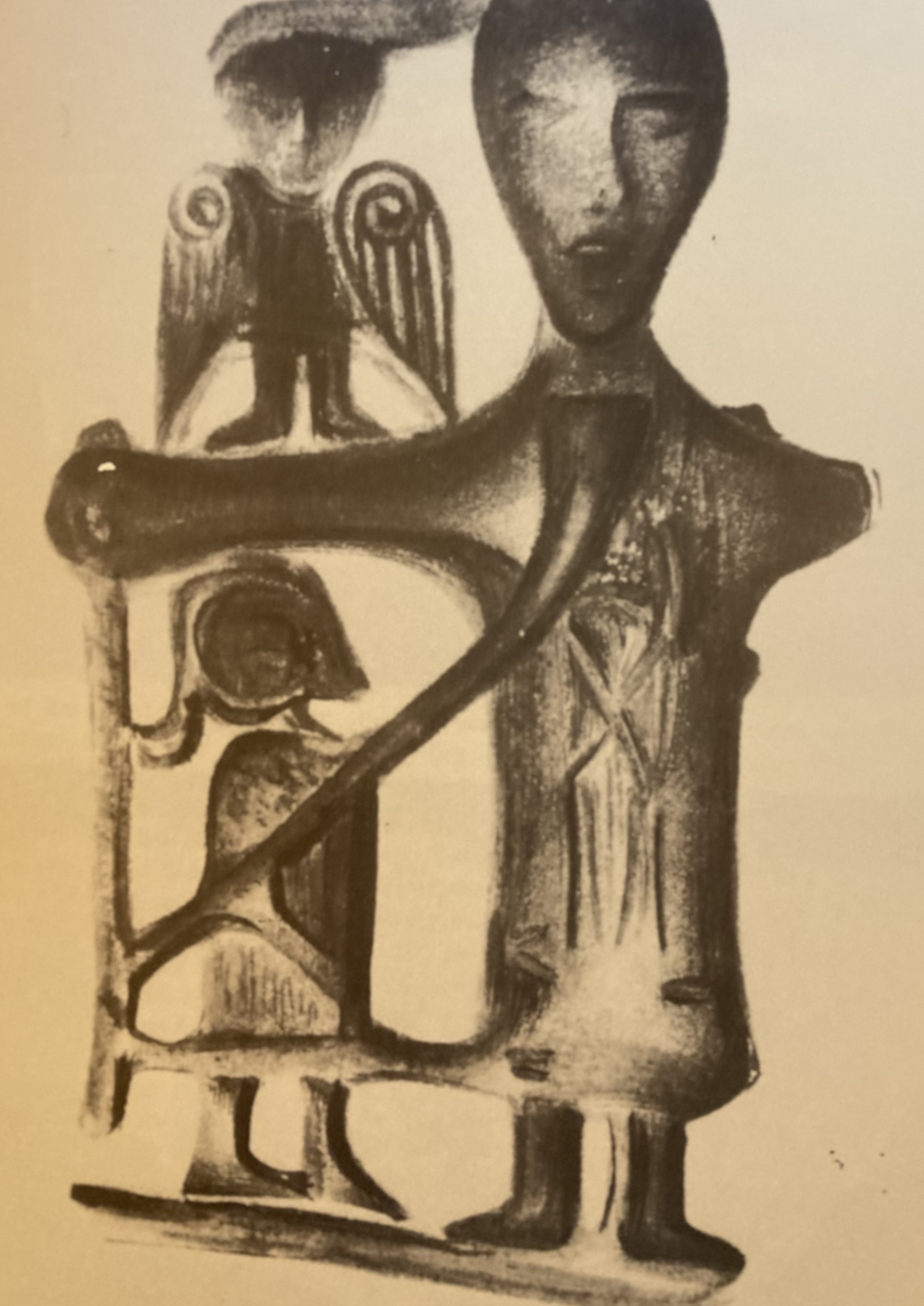
1830s watercolour of the Mayo fragment.

The group shares distinguishing elements when compared to other surviving examples. In each example, the angels, Stephaton and Longinus are static. The angels stand upright on Christ's shoulders rather than kneel or hover. Unusually, in both examples, Longinus is to Christ's left while Stephaton is to his right. Christ's eyes are formed from inlayed glass. Stephaton is shown in profile with a single arm and one large and oval eye visible. His hair is depicted in strands that end in a large curl. He wears a long robe with ends that curve inwards.

Longinus looks directly outwards in the Clonmacnoise Plaque; the only other instance in the overall group where one soldier is in profile and the other looks out frontally is the Killaloe Plaque.

=== Killalon ===
The Killalon group consists of the 11th-century plaque found in Killaloe, County Clare and the 11th or 12th-century Kells Plaque in the British Museum, which was found in County Kilkenny. Like those in the Clonmacnoise group, the figures stand upright rather than kneel or hover. In the Killalon group, Christ is bare-chested and wears a short and narrow loincloth. His stranded hair is centrally parted and extends horizontally onto the shoulders of the angels.

The soldiers are positioned on opposite sides of the plaque, unlike the other examples, and each is secured to the frame by two metal straps.

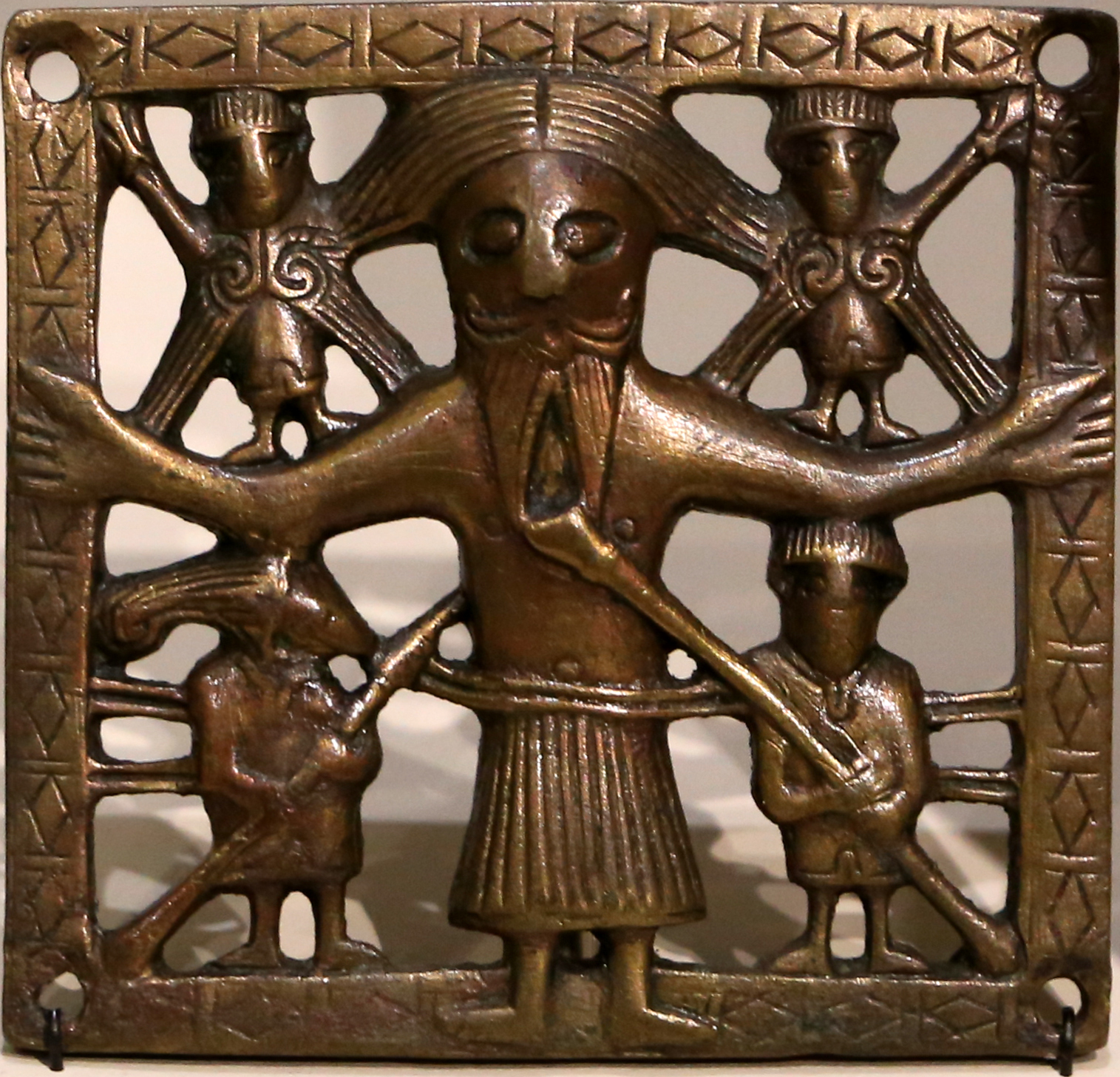
Crucifixion plaque found in Killaloe, County Clare, 11th century, NMI. H: 7.3 cm (2.9 in)

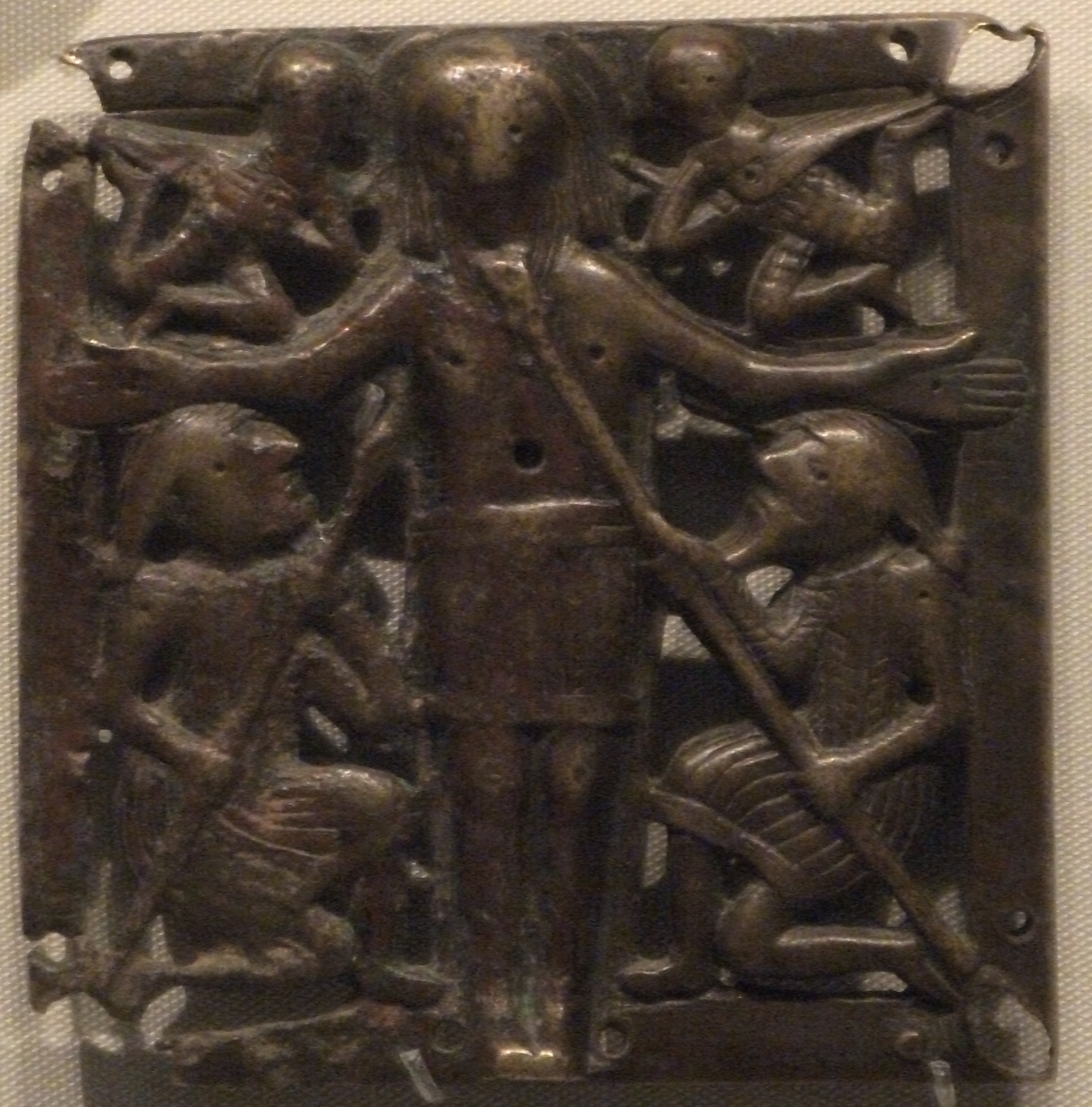
The Kells Crucifixion Plaque, British Museum, 11th or 12th century. H: 8.2 cm (3.2 in)

=== Tynan ===
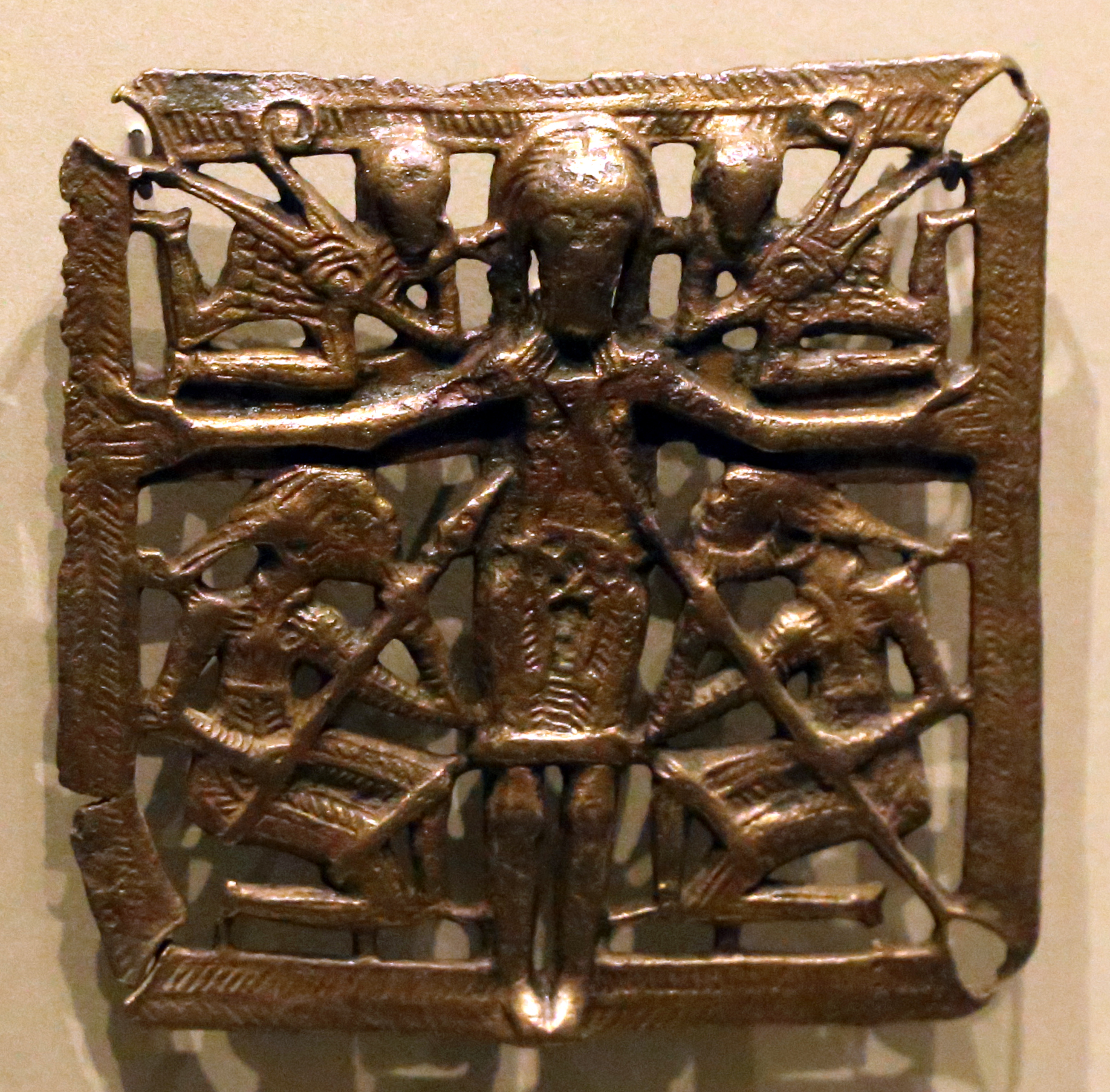
The Anketell Crucifixion plaque, c. 1110. H: 8.0 cm (3.1 in). NMI, Dublin

The grouping consists of the Tynan and Anketell plaques are thought to have been produced by a workshop based outside of Armagh town. The Anketell plaque was found in Emyvale, County Monaghan, around ten kilometres west of Tynan and 25 kilometres from Armagh. Both plaques are assumed to have been produced later than the other examples, given their resemblance to the figures on the crucified figure on Saint Mel's Cross and other confidently dated late 12th-century artefacts.

In both Christ's head, hands and feet extend over the outer frame, and he is emaciated with clearly visible ribs. Longinus is crouched and holds a spear diagonally against Christ's right side. The frames in both plaques are elaborately decorated and divided by semi-circular arches. The angels hover and the soldiers are crouched. Christ's body is long and slender and dressed in a small and, according to Murray, "tight-fitting" loincloth.

=== Others ===
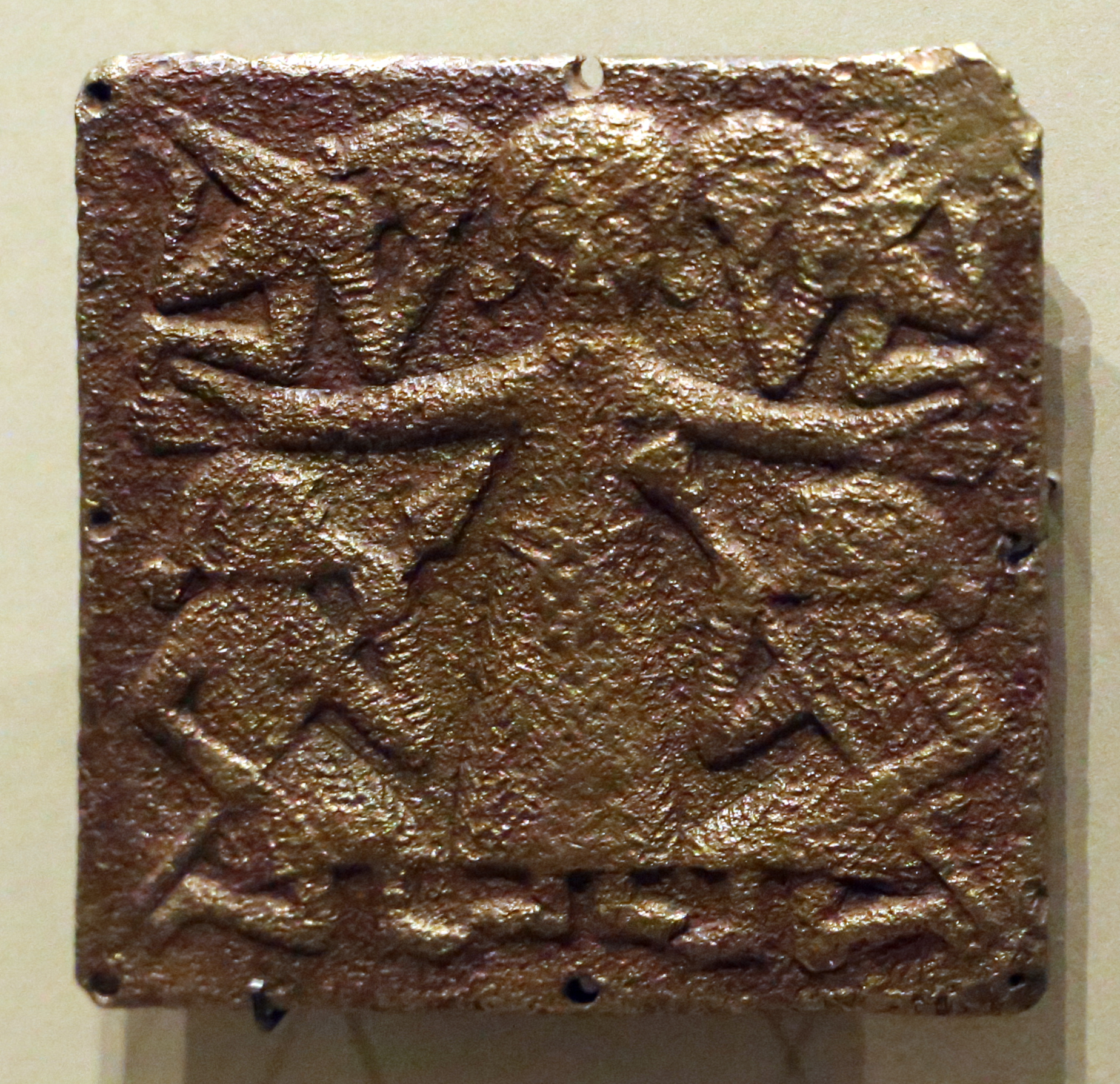
The Lismore plaque. Brass, h: 85 mm (3.3 in). NMI

Because of its early dating, large size and find spot on the east coast of Ireland, archaeologists consider the Rinnegan Plaque as separate from the other groupings. Harbison described the plaque as characterising the "Celtic artist's ornamental, stylised and mysteriously unrealistic approach to an otherwise naturalistically-represented theme of vital significance to Christian art" and as one of the "most frequently illustrated examples of early Irish art, along with the Book of Kells, the Tara Brooch and the Ardagh Chalice".

There are four plaques of unknown provenance, including the 12th-century Lismore Plaque, and two others similarly dated and also in the NMI.

== Sources ==
- Bourke, Cormac. "The Chronology of Irish Crucifixion Plaques". In: Higgitt, John (ed.). The Age of Migrating Ideas: Early Medieval Art in Northern Britain and Ireland. Sutton Publishing, 1993. ISBN 0-7509-0357-0
- de Paor, Máire. "An Openwork Crucifixion Plaque from Clonmacnoise". The Journal of the Royal Society of Antiquaries of Ireland, volume 84, no. 1, 1954. JSTOR 25509155 ISSN 0035-9106
- Gougaud, Dom Louis; Armstrong, E.C.R. "The Earliest Irish Representations of the Crucifixion". Journal of the Royal Society of Antiquaries of Ireland, Sixth Series, volume 10, number 2, December 31, 1920. pp. 128-139. JSTOR 25514570
- Hamlin, Ann; Haworth, R. G. "A Crucifixion Plaque Reprovenanced". The Journal of the Royal Society of Antiquaries of Ireland, volume 112, 1982. JSTOR 25508821 ISSN 0035-9106
- Harbison, Peter. The Crucifixion in Irish Art. Dublin: Columba Press, 2000. ISBN 978-1-8560-7278-6
- Harbison, Peter. "A lost crucifixion plaque of Clonmacnoise type found in County Mayo". ̄In: Murtagh, Harman. Irish Midland Studies: Essays in Commemoration of N.W. English. Athlone: Journal of the Old Athlone Society, 1980. ISBN 0-9503-4281-5 ISSN 0790-0155
- Henry, Françoise. Irish art during the Viking Invasions (800–1020 A.D.). London: Methuen, 1967. ISBN 0-4164-4250-1
- Herren, Michael; Brown, Shirley Ann. Christ in Celtic Christianity: Britain and Ireland from the Fifth to the Tenth Century. Boydell Press, 2012. ISBN 978-1-8438-3713-8
- Johnson, Ruth. "Irish Crucifixion Plaques: Viking Age or Romanesque?". The Journal of the Royal Society of Antiquaries of Ireland, volume 128, 1998. JSTOR 25549845 ISSN 0035-9106
- MacDermott, Máire. "An Openwork Crucifixion Plaque from Clonmacnoise". The Journal of the Royal Society of Antiquaries of Ireland, volume 84, No. 1, 1954. JSTOR 25509155 ISSN 0035-9106
- Marzinzik, Sonja. Masterpieces: Early Medieval Art. London: British Museum Press, 2014. ISBN 978-0-7141-2320-2
- Mitchell, G. Frank. "Foreign Influences and the Beginnings of Christian Art". In: Treasures of early Irish art, 1500 B.C. to 1500 A.D: From the collections of the National Museum of Ireland, Royal Irish Academy, Trinity College Dublin Archived 2021-06-06 at the Wayback Machine. NY: Metropolitan Museum of Art, 1977. ISBN 0-8709-9164-7
- Moss, Rachel. Medieval c. 400—c. 1600. "Art and Architecture of Ireland" series. London: Yale University Press, 2014. ISBN 978-0-3001-7919-4
- Murray, Griffin. "Irish crucifixion plaques: a reassessment. In: Mullins, Juliet; Ni Ghradaigh, Jenifer (eds): Envisioning Christ on the Cross: Ireland and the Early Medieval West. Dublin: eds J. Mullins, J. Ní Ghrádaigh and R. Hawtree, 2014. ISBN 978-1-8468-2387-9
- Murray, Griffin. "The provenance of an Irish Crucifixion plaque Archived 2025-02-28 at the Wayback Machine". Archaeology Ireland, volume 26, number 4, issue 102, 2012. ISSN 0790-892X
- Ó Floinn, Raghnal. "Schools of Metalworking in Eleventh and Twelfth-century Ireland". In: Ryan, Michael (ed.), Ireland and Insular Art, A.D.500-1200: Conference Proceedings, Dublin: Royal Irish Academy, 1987. ISBN 0-9017-1454-2
- Ó Floinn, Raghnal; Wallace, Patrick (eds). Treasures of the National Museum of Ireland: Irish Antiquities. Dublin: National Museum of Ireland, 2002. ISBN 0-7171-2829-6
- Timoney, Martin. "Two Stone Crucifixion Plaques from East Connacht". ̄In: Murtagh, Harman. Irish Midland Studies: Essays in Commemoration of N.W. English. Athlone: Old Athlone Society, 1980. ISBN 0-9503-4281-5
- O'Toole, Fintan. A History of Ireland in 100 Objects Archived 2021-10-26 at the Wayback Machine. Dublin: Royal Irish Academy, 2013. ISBN 978-1-9089-9615-2
- Raftery, Joseph. Christian Art in Ancient Ireland. Volume 2. Dublin: Stationery Office of Ireland, 1941. ASIN: B00HN7OCBQ
- Youngs, Susan. "The Work of Angels", Masterpieces of Celtic Metalwork, 6th–9th centuries AD. London: British Museum Press, 1989. ISBN 0-7141-0554-6
