= List of Crucifixion plaques =

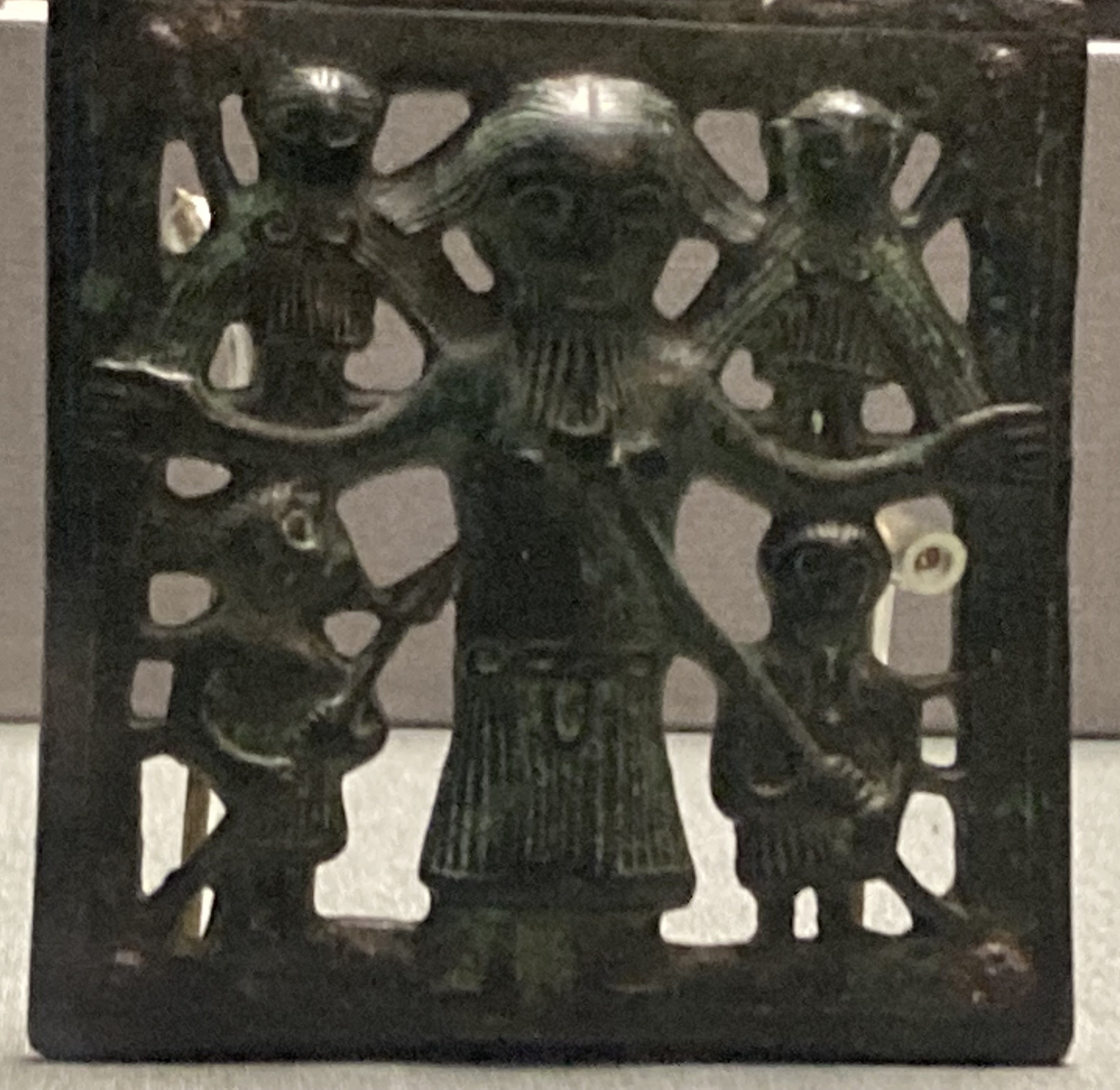
Killaloe Crucifixion Plaque, late 7th or early 8th century

The following is a complete list of the nine surviving Early Medieval Irish Crucifixion plaques, although many more would have been produced. Eight are extant and one is known from a 19th-century watercolour reproduction. Four have an established provenance; the others are grouped based on figurative similarities to these known examples. It may be that the examples in each group were produced by separate workshops.

Crucifixion plaques are a rare example of figurative in early Irish art. Their iconography and form seems to be influenced by The earlier illuminated manuscripts and stone sculpture. The Rinnegan Plaque is dated to c. 700 AD and is 21 cm (8.3 in) in height, making it much larger and pre-dating the other examples by over three centuries, and is the finest of the group. Based on their artistic style and iconography, archaeologists date the other plaques to within the late 10th and early 12th centuries. The other plaques are square-shaped and of a similar size (c. 9 cm (3.5 in) x 9 cm (3.5 in)), and made of cast bronze or copper alloy. They are all made using openwork with the exception of the Lismore Plaque.

== The plaques ==
In 1980, the archaeologist Peter Harbison identified the then-known six plaques as a distinct type. He divided them into the Clonmacnoise (in County Offaly and Dungannon, County Tyrone groups, based on their find-spots, iconography and form, including the pose of the figures and decoration of the borders. Harbison believes that, except for the c. 700 AD Rinnegan plaque, they all dated to c. 1100 AD.

Since Harbison's publication, the Dungannon Plaque is now localised to Tynan, County Armagh, near the find-spot of a recently found plaque from Anketell, County Monaghan, while another example is now thought to originate from Lismore, County Waterford. Based on these findings, the archaeologist Griffin Murray further divided the plaques into the "Tynan", "Clonmacnoise", "Klllalon" (or "Kells") groups and "others" (i.e. those unlocalised either by find-spot or style and the very early and geographically distinct Rinnegan Plaque).

Work	Title	Date	Find spot	Material	Height	Harbison number	Murray Grouping	Current location
	Rinnegan Crucifixion Plaque	c. 700AD	Rinnagan, near Athlone, County Westmeath	Bronze	21 cm (8.3 in)	n/a	n/a	National Museum of Ireland (NMI), Dublin
	Clonmacnoise Crucifixion Plaque	10th century	Clonmacnoise monastery, County Offaly	Bronze, gilt openwork, repoussé	8.0 cm (3.1 in)	2	Clonmacnoise	NMI
	Lismore Crucifixion Plaque	c. 1090—1113	Lismore, County Waterford	brass	7.6 cm (3.0 in)	4	Killalon	NMI
	Tynan Crucifixion Plaque	c. 1100	Tynan, County Armagh	Bronze	8.2 cm (3.2 in)		Tynan	NMI
	Anketell Crucifixion Plaque	c. 1110	Emyvale, County Monaghan	gunmetal	8.0 cm (3.1 in)	5	Tynan	NMI
	Killaloe Crucifixion Plaque	11th century	Killaloe, County Clare	leaded gunmetal	7.3 cm (2.9 in)	3	Killalon	NMI
	Academy Crucifixion Plaque	?	Unlocalised	brass	7.2 cm (2.8 in)		Killalon	NMI
	Kells Crucifixion Plaque	11th or 12th century	Kells, County Meath	brass	8.2 cm (3.2 in)	6	Killalon	British Museum, London
	Mayo Crucifixion Plaque	?	County Mayo	?	8.5 cm (3.3 in)?	1	Clonmacnoise	Lost

== Sources ==
- Bourke, Cormac. "The Chronology of Irish Crucifixion Plaques". In: Higgitt, John (ed.). The Age of Migrating Ideas: Early Medieval Art in Northern Britain and Ireland. Sutton Publishing, 1993. ISBN 0-7509-0357-0
- Hamlin, Ann; Haworth, R. G. "A Crucifixion Plaque Reprovenanced". The Journal of the Royal Society of Antiquaries of Ireland, volume 112, 1982. JSTOR 25508821 ISSN 0035-9106
- Harbison, Peter. "The Bronze Crucifixion Plaque said to be from St John's (Rinnegan), near Athlone". ̄Journal of Irish Archaeology volume 11, 1984. JSTOR 30001578
- Harbison, Peter. The Crucifixion in Irish Art. Dublin: Columba Press, 2000. ISBN 978-1-8560-7278-6
- Harbison, Peter. "A lost crucifixion plaque of Clonmacnoise type found in County Mayo". ̄In: Murtagh, Harman. Irish Midland Studies: Essays in Commemoration of N.W. English. Athlone: Journal of the Old Athlone Society, 1980. ISBN 0-9503-4281-5 ISSN 0790-0155
- Herren, Michael; Brown, Shirley Ann. Christ in Celtic Christianity: Britain and Ireland from the Fifth to the Tenth Century. Boydell Press, 2012. ISBN 978-1-8438-3713-8
- de Paor, Máire. "An Openwork Crucifixion Plaque from Clonmacnoise". The Journal of the Royal Society of Antiquaries of Ireland, volume 84, no. 1, 1954. JSTOR 25509155 ISSN 0035-9106
- Johnson, Ruth. "Irish Crucifixion Plaques: Viking Age or Romanesque?". The Journal of the Royal Society of Antiquaries of Ireland, volume 128, 1998. JSTOR 25549845
- MacDermott, Máire. "An Openwork Crucifixion Plaque from Clonmacnoise". The Journal of the Royal Society of Antiquaries of Ireland, volume 84, No. 1, 1954. JSTOR 25509155 ISSN 0035-9106
- Moss, Rachel. Medieval c. 400—c. 1600. "Art and Architecture of Ireland" series. London: Yale University Press, 2014. ISBN 978-0-3001-7919-4
- Murray, Griffin. "Irish crucifixion plaques: a reassessment. In: Mullins, Juliet; Ni Ghradaigh, Jenifer (eds): Envisioning Christ on the Cross: Ireland and the Early Medieval West. Dublin: eds J. Mullins, J. Ní Ghrádaigh and R. Hawtree, 2014. ISBN 978-1-8468-2387-9
- Murray, Griffin. "The provenance of an Irish Crucifixion plaque Archived 2025-02-28 at the Wayback Machine". Archaeology Ireland, volume 26, number 4, issue 102, 2012
