= Lismore Crucifixion Plaque =

10th- or 11th-century Irish sculpture

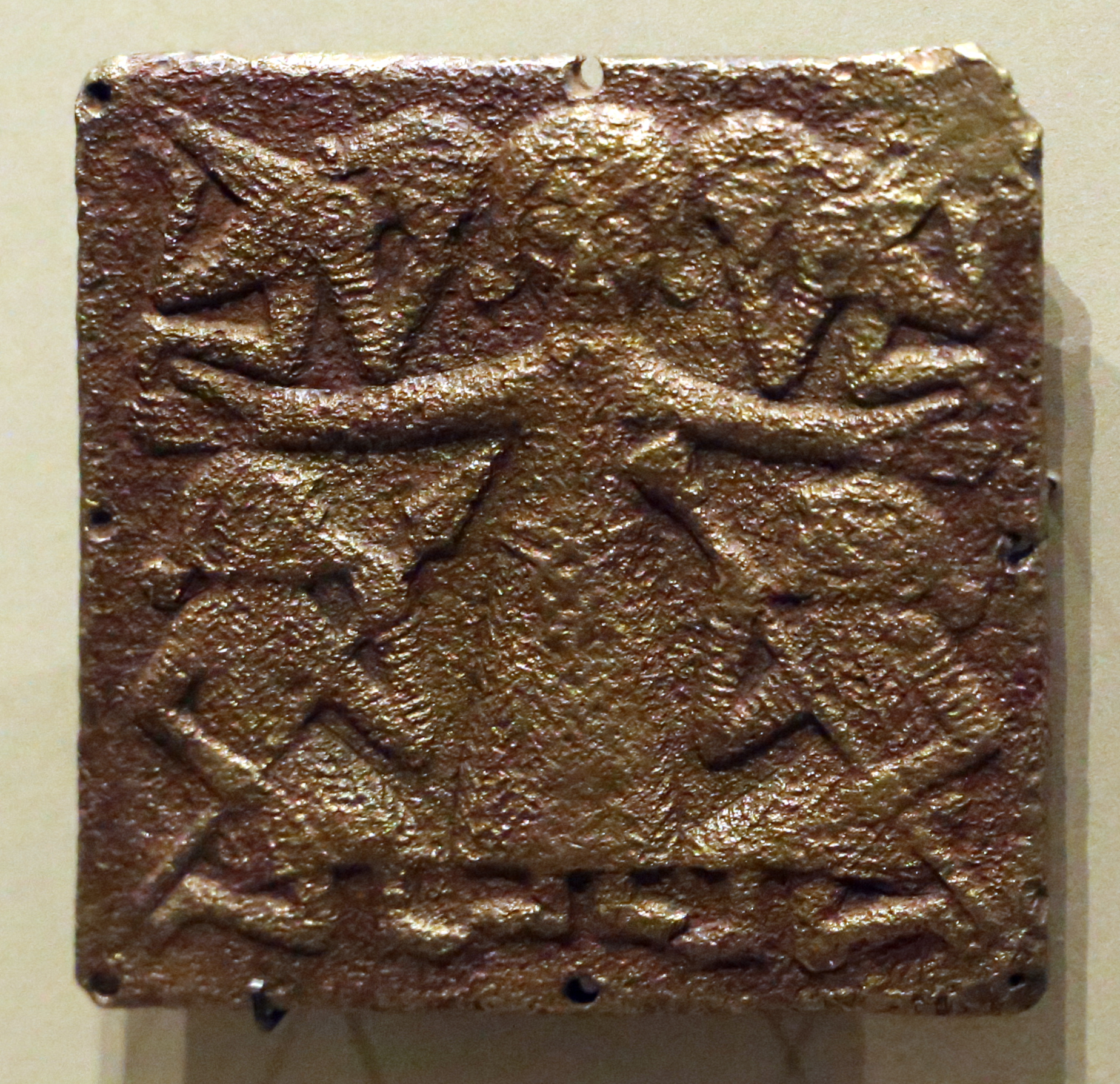
- Front face of the Lismore Plaque
- Material: Brass
- Size: Height 7.6 cm (3.0 in), width x .08 cm (0.031 in)
- Created: c. 1090—1113
- Period/culture: Early Medieval, Insular
- Place: Lismore, County Waterford, Ireland
- Present location: National Museum of Ireland, Dublin
- Identification: R.29 16

The Lismore Crucifixion Plaque is an early medieval Irish brass sculpture showing the Christ crucified in a long robe, with two biblical figures (Stephaton and Longinus) in the quadrants below his outstretched arms, and two angels in the quadrants above them.

The Lismore plaque was produced sometime between the late 11th and early 12th centuries, and is one of a corpus of nine known insular Crucifixion plaques. The crucifixion plaques are all similarly sized and all present Christ, Stephaton, Longinus and the two angels in the same positions. The Lismore plaque is distinct in that it is carved in low relief rather than achieved through openwork.

== Description ==
The central Christ figure has long hair which is swept across his forehead and ends at his shoulders, where it terminates in curls. He wears a long robe that ends above his knees. The robe is decorated with bands of herringbone located just below the shoulders. The garment is fastened by a small belt formed via an interlaced knot.

Christ's body is relatively proportional, rather than much bigger in comparison to the surrounding figures, and the plaque does not have a frame. Christ has large oval eyes. He has a long nose, a thin mouth and a beard that terminates in decorated curls or spirals.

== Dating ==
The Lismore plaque was rediscovered in Lismore, County Waterford and is roughly contemporaneous with the Lismore Crozier, which is confidently dated to around 1100. Both objects contain elements such as silver inlay, leading to the dating of the plaque to the same period, and speculation amongst archaeologists that the same workshop produced both objects.

The plaque is in poor condition with most of the surface degraded through wear and exposure.

== Sources ==
- Harbison, Peter. "A Lost Crucifixion Plaque of Clonmacnoise Type found in County Mayo". ̄Irish Midland Studies: Essays in Commemoration of N.W. English. Athlone, 1980. ISBN 0-9503-4281-5
- Johnson, Ruth. "Irish Crucifixion Plaques: Viking Age or Romanesque?". The Journal of the Royal Society of Antiquaries of Ireland, volume 128, 1998. JSTOR 25549845
- Murray, Griffin. "Irish crucifixion plaques: a reassessment. In: Mullins, Juliet; Ni Ghradaigh, Jenifer (eds): Envisioning Christ on the Cross: Ireland and the Early Medieval West. University of Notre Dame: Thomas F.X. Noble, 2014
- Ó Floinn, Raghnal; Wallace, Patrick. Treasures of the National Museum of Ireland: Irish Antiquities. Dublin: National Museum of Ireland, 2002. ISBN 0-7171-2829-6
