= Tynan Crucifixion Plaque =

10th or 11th century Irish Bronze sculpture

The Tynan Crucifixion Plaque
- Material: Bronze
- Size: Height: 8.2 cm (3.2 in); Width: 8.6 cm (3.4 in)
- Created: c. 1100
- Period/culture: Insular, Early Medieval
- Place: Tynan, County Armagh
- Present location: National Museum of Ireland

The Tynan Crucifixion Plaque is a small early medieval sculpture found in 1844 near Tynan, County Armagh, Northern Ireland. It is dated to c. 1100 and made from bronze. As with the seven other extant Irish Early medieval Crucifixion plaques, it shows the Crucifixion of Jesus in high relief, with two attendant angels hovering above his arms to his immediate left and right. Below them are representations of the Roman soldiers Stephaton (the sponge-bearer) and Longinus (the lance-bearer) driving spears into Christ's chest.

It is very similar in size and form to the Anketell Crucifixion Plaque, which may have been produced by the same workshop.

The four puncture holes on its reverse indicate that it was built as an attachment to a larger object, perhaps an altar cross or as the front piece for an altar. Its modern provenance is unknown, but it was incorrectly described as the Dungannon plaque in the 18th century. Today it is in the collection of the National Museum of Ireland (NMI) in Dublin.

== Origin ==
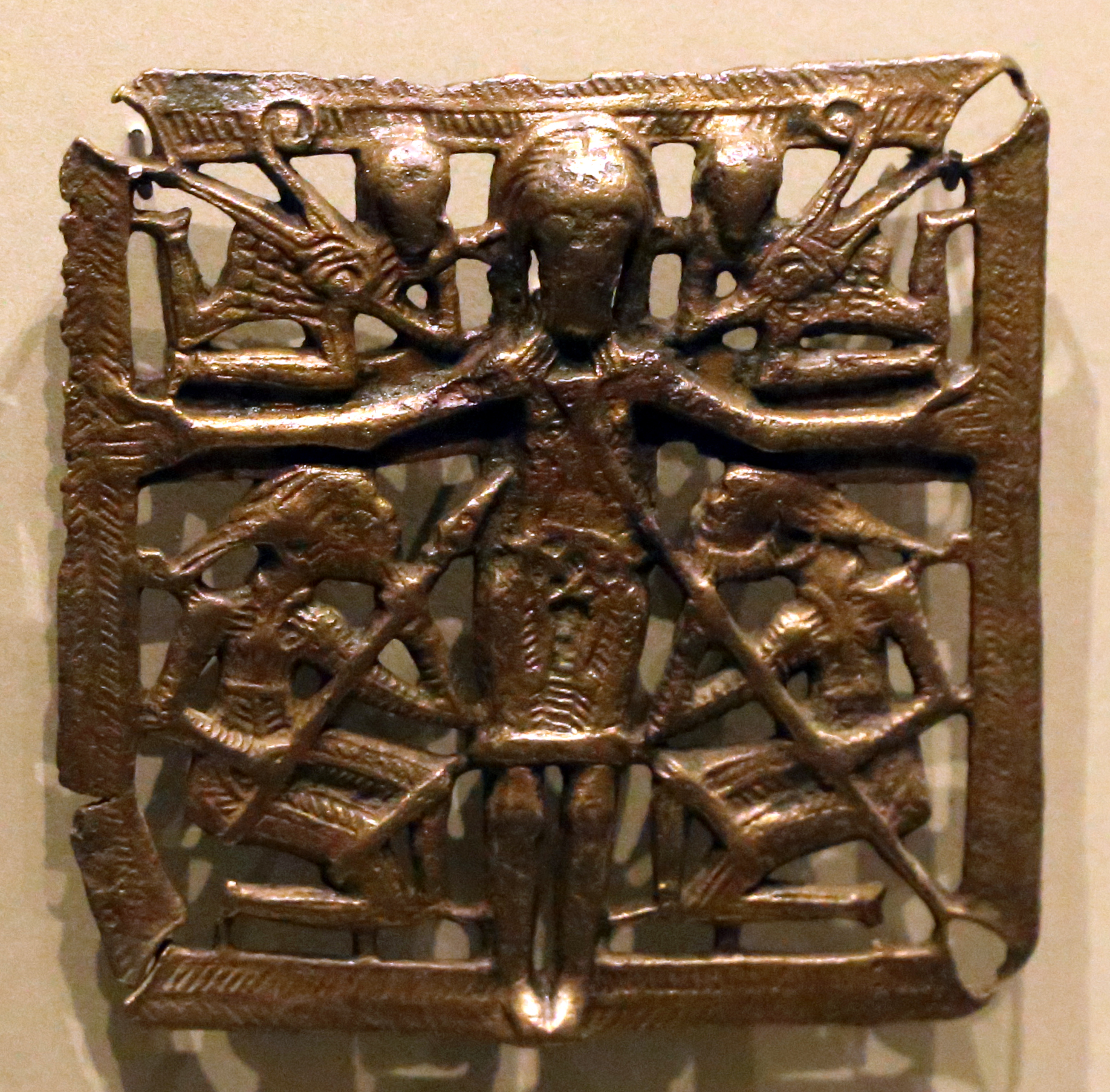
The Anketell Crucifixion Plaque, c. 1110, NMI, Dublin

Archaeologists assume that contemporary Irish Early Medieval objects were buried to avoid plunder by the Vikings or Norman invaders. There is no record of the Tynan plaque's rediscovery, but it is thought to have happened in the mid-19th century, at Marrassit or College Hall townland, nearby to the parish and village of Tynan in County Armagh. Its dating to c. 1100, that is pre-the pre-Norman, is based on its figure's similarity to those on contemporary high crosses, and a 12th-century figure of Christ on a doorway on a church site in Maghera, County Londonderry.

The Tynan Plaque is thought to have originated from the same workshop that produced the c. 1110 Anketell Crucifixion Plaque, now in the National Museum of Ireland (NMI), Dublin. The workshop may have been active in Armagh town, just c. 7 miles east of Tynan.

== Description ==
As with the seven other extant early medieval Crucifixion plaques, the Tynan figures are in high relief, with a central panel of the crucified Jesus surrounded by four smaller panels showing Stephaton and Longinus (the lance and sponge bearers) in the lower quadrants, and two hovering attendant angels above Christ's arms. The Tynan plaque is one of the smaller and later examples of the type. In contrast to the earlier examples, Christ's hands are not nailed to the cross, and usually, the angles on the lower half have bird-like beaks. His arms are elongated compared to the rest of his body.

Christ is naked except for a short and tight fitting loincloth whose lines seem to intertwine into the forms of the saints below, while Stephaton and Longinus' hair and garments merge into the plaque's border. Like those on the Clonmacnoise plaque, the faces have been worn down over the centuries. Another theory is that the plaques were intended as decoration for book covers, similar to the ivory crucifixion plaques on Carolingian bindings. Griffin argues that they were intended to be attached to large wood and metal altar crosses, such as the Tully Lough Cross, which contains very similar figures.
