= Southampton Psalter =

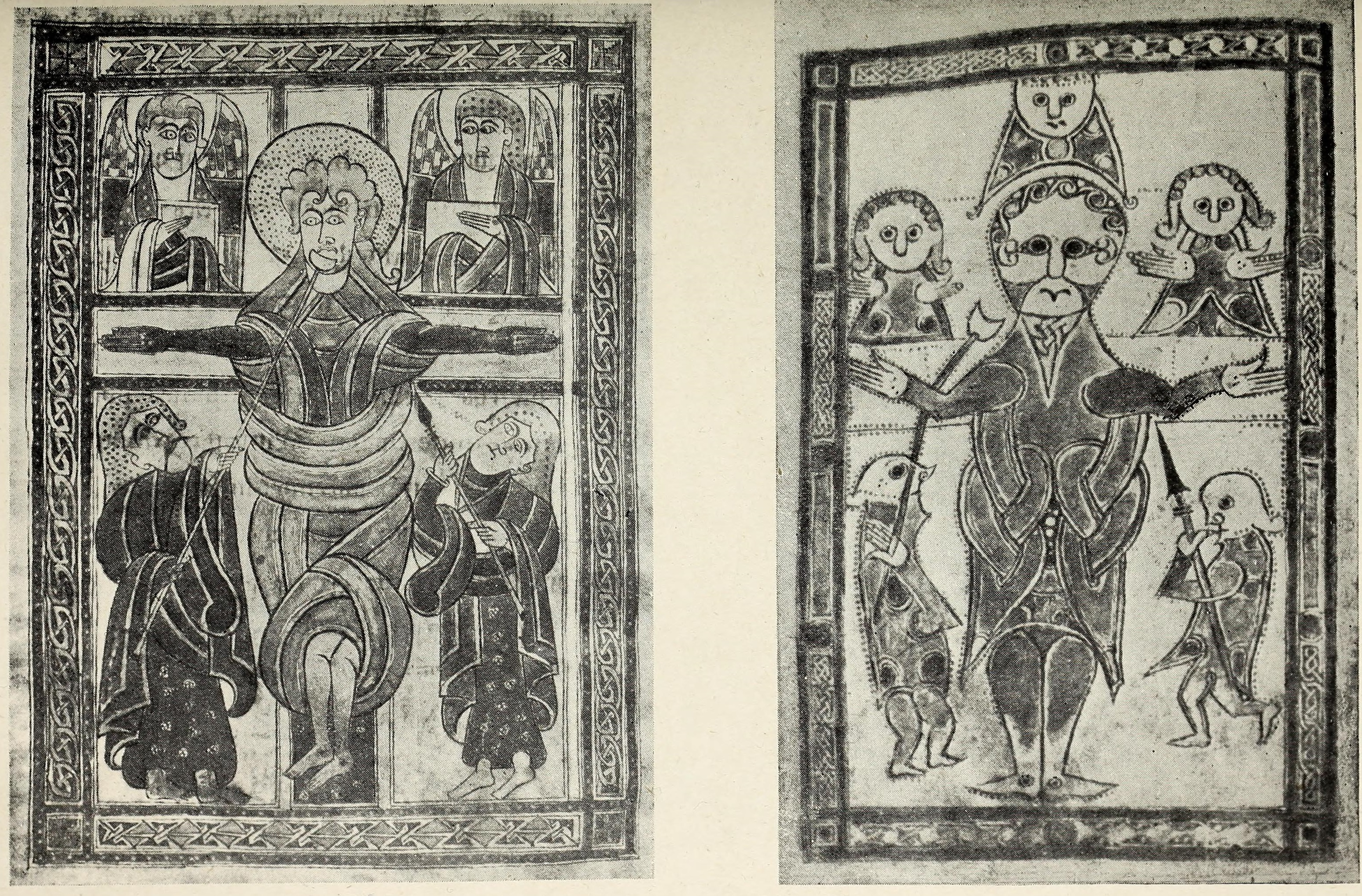
Comparison of the Crucifixion miniatures in the St. Gall Gospel Book and the Southampton Psalter

The Southampton Psalter (Cambridge St John's College MS C.9) is an Insular illuminated Psalter from Ireland. It is asserted by some, to be from the ninth century, while other scholars have argued for a tenth- or even early eleventh-century dating. It has illuminations including three full page miniatures and also contains numerous annotations in both Latin and Old Irish.

In the tradition of Irish psalters, the 150 psalms are divided into three groups of fifty, each headed by a full-page miniature facing a text page with decorated initial and border. The figures in the miniatures are highly stylized in the tradition of Irish manuscripts at this time, and painted in a palette of yellow, purple and red. The three full page miniatures show David in two scenes with animals, a Crucifixion of Jesus and David and Goliath.
