= Tully Lough Cross =

8th or 9th century Irish cross

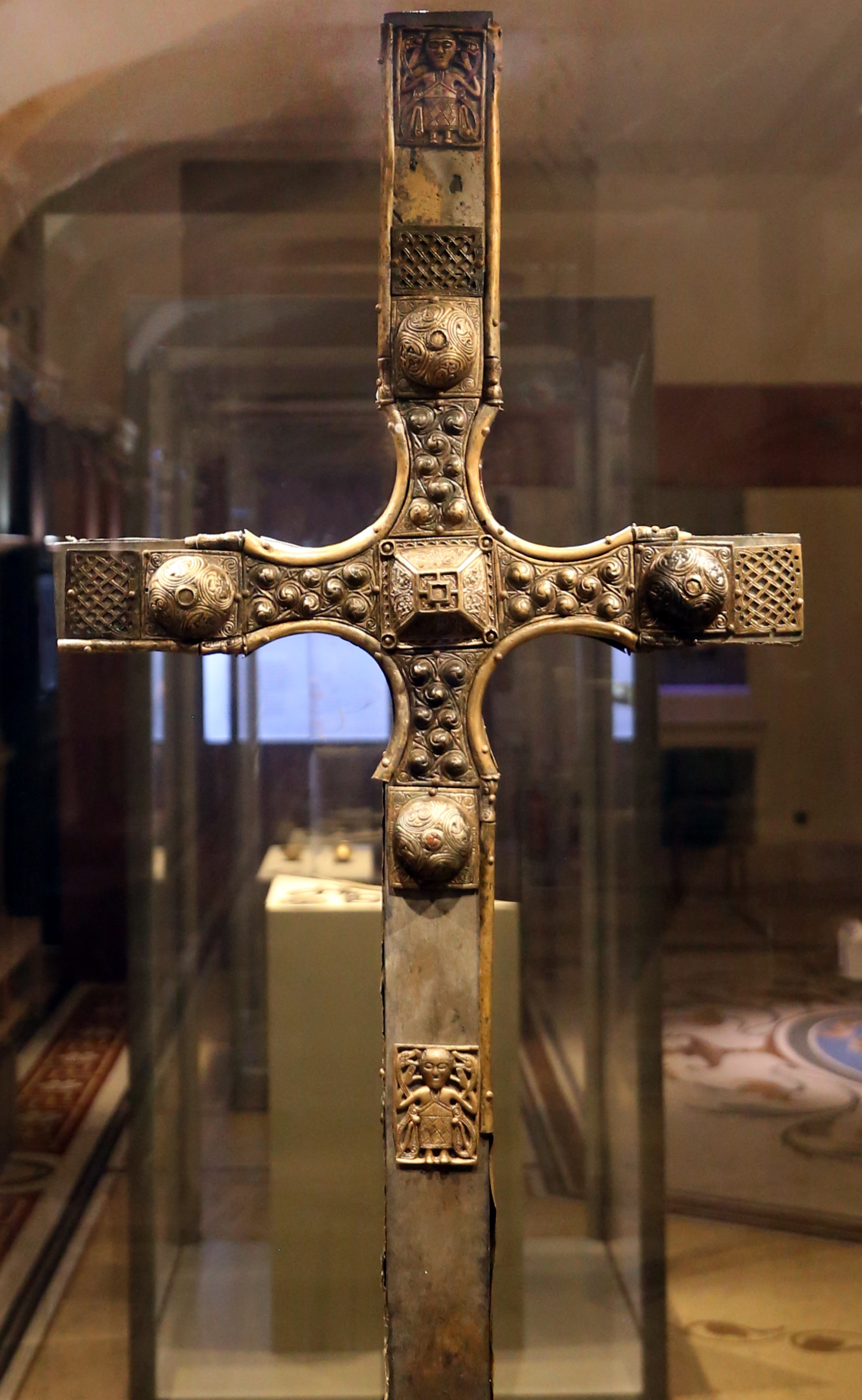
- Upper part of the cross
- Material: Oak, bronze, gold, glass, amber
- Size: Height: 127 cm (50 in); Width: 43.8 cm (17.2 in)
- Created: 8th or 9th century
- Discovered: July 1986; Tully Lough, County Roscommon
- Present location: National Museum of Ireland, Kildare Street, Dublin

The Tully Lough Cross is an 8th- or 9th-century Irish altar or processional cross discovered in 1986 at the bottom of Tully Lough, County Roscommon. Although its origin is unknown, archaeologists associate it with a nearby church in Kilmore. It was formed from a wooden core overlain with bronze sheets containing spirals influenced by Iron Age Celtic Ultimate La Tène style. Its dating is based on its use of amber and style of ornamentation.

When rediscovered, the Tully Lough Cross was badly damaged, and broken into pieces. It was repaired in the late 1980s when lost metal parts were replaced, and it was reconstruction based on similar crosses from contemporary Irish manuscript illustrations and high crosses. The divers failed to report the finding of this highly important object of national heritage to the Irish government, as required by law. One of them was later prosecuted for trying to sell it to a number of American museums, including the Getty in California at an offer price of $1.75m.

It was acquired by the NMI in 1990, where it is on permanent display.

== Discovery ==
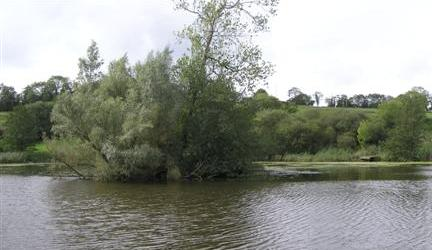
The crannog on Lough Tully near the cross's find spot.

The Tully Lough Cross was found by a diver in July 1986 at the bed of Tully Lough, County Roscommon, near a crannog (an artificial island used for dwelling). The divers failed, as required by law, to report the finding to the Irish government, and attempted to sell the item to a number of American museums. The Irish government learned of the sale when the J. Paul Getty Museum in California notified the National Museum of Ireland (NMI) that they had been contacted via a letter by "a lady in Massachusetts ... acting on behalf of two friends". She said she felt that, "a modest request would be 1.75 million dollars", before adding that she wanted the offer "kept in the utmost confidence".

Dr Michael Ryan, then Keeper of Irish Antiquities at the NMI, informed the Getty that the cross had been "illicitly excavated from an Irish site ... and represents part of a pattern of plundering of our heritage which is currently the subject of a top-level investigation". The investigation eventually led to one of the discoverers being convicted in the Athlone District Court, after the Irish Government, at the request of the NMI, "decided to get tough with metal detectors and treasure hunters".

The attempted sale led to a change in Irish law after the T.D. Tom Enright brought an amendment to the Irish Constitution prohibiting the foreign sale of historically significant heritage artefacts, and raised the minimal penalty from £50 to £50,000, or six months in prison.

== Description ==
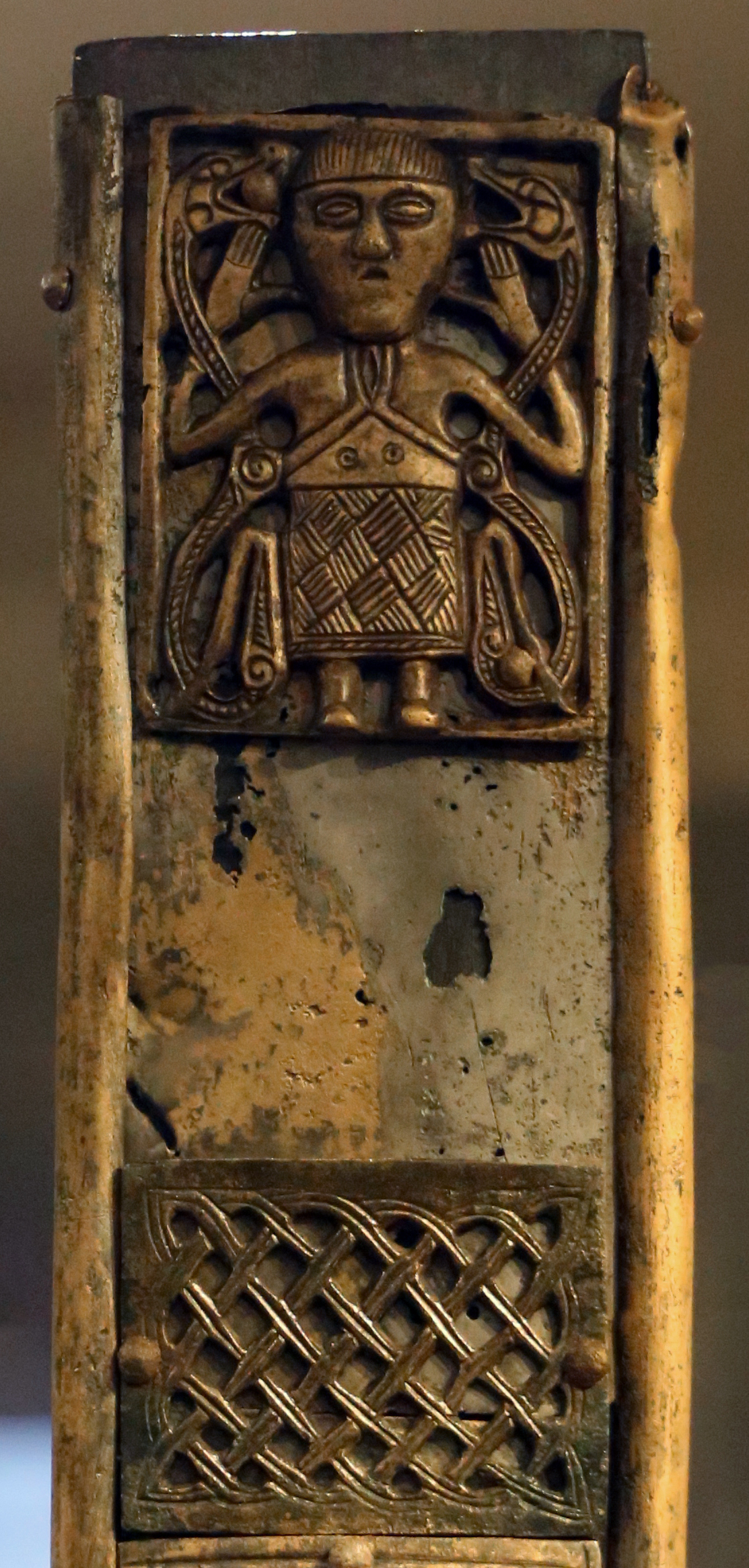
Detail of the three inserted panels (one is missing) on the upper arm of the cross.

The Tully Lough Cross was broken up into a number of pieces. Its reconstruction is 127 cm (50 in) high and 43.8 cm (17.2 in) wide. It unknown whether it was dismantled before it was deposited in the lake or whether it broke on first impact with the lough bed, or disintegrated due to centuries of wear. Archeologists estimate that it was hidden around the mid-12th century, during the Irish Church reform.

It was commissioned as either an altar or ceremonial processional cross. It was built from an oak core lined with plain tinned copper-alloy (bronze) sheets forming the upright arms and crosspiece. Tinned sheets were added to add a sheen reminiscent of silver. These sheets are connected by tubular binding strips and at the middle by a halved joint, an iron nail, and bronze fittings shaped as animal heads. It contains a number of gilt pyramidal and circular bosses and mounts. It contains about twenty surviving bronze panels, many of which are highly decorated with ornate patterns and designs influenced by the late Iron Age La Tène style. Three contain interlace, and the two figurative panels, at the top of the upper arm and halfway down between the crosspiece and base, have openwork. The reverse is less decorated but does contain bosses and mounts.

The figurative panels are near-identical, with both showing a man dressed in a léine/tunic reaching beyond his knees, standing between two confronted animals, and may represent either the Nativity of Jesus as prophesied, according to some Christian interpretations, in Habakkuk 3:2 ("In the midst of two animals Thou shalt become known") or the biblical tale of Daniel in the lions' den. The man's eyes are closed in the upper panel but open in the lower arm.

== Irish processional crosses ==
The cross bears a number of similarities to the 12th-century Cross of Cong, including its cusped cross-arms, elaborate glass studs, indicating that its basic form was in use for at least four centuries.

Although there is no other surviving Irish contemporary cross of this type, representations of the form can be found in some manuscript illustrations and high crosses, including the Ruthwell Cross found in Dumfriesshire, Scotland. The very similar Anglo-Saxon Cross of Saint Rupert is now in Bischofshofen, Austria. Unlike the Cross of Cong, it is not thought to have been intended to contain a relic. A very similar pyramidal mount was found in the West Midlands in England in 2014, and has also been dated to the 8th or 9th centuries.

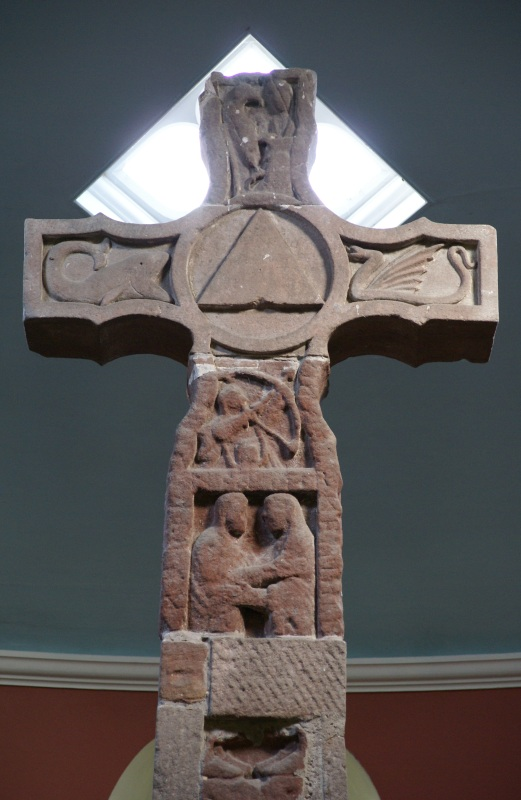
The Ruthwell Cross, 8th century, Northumbria

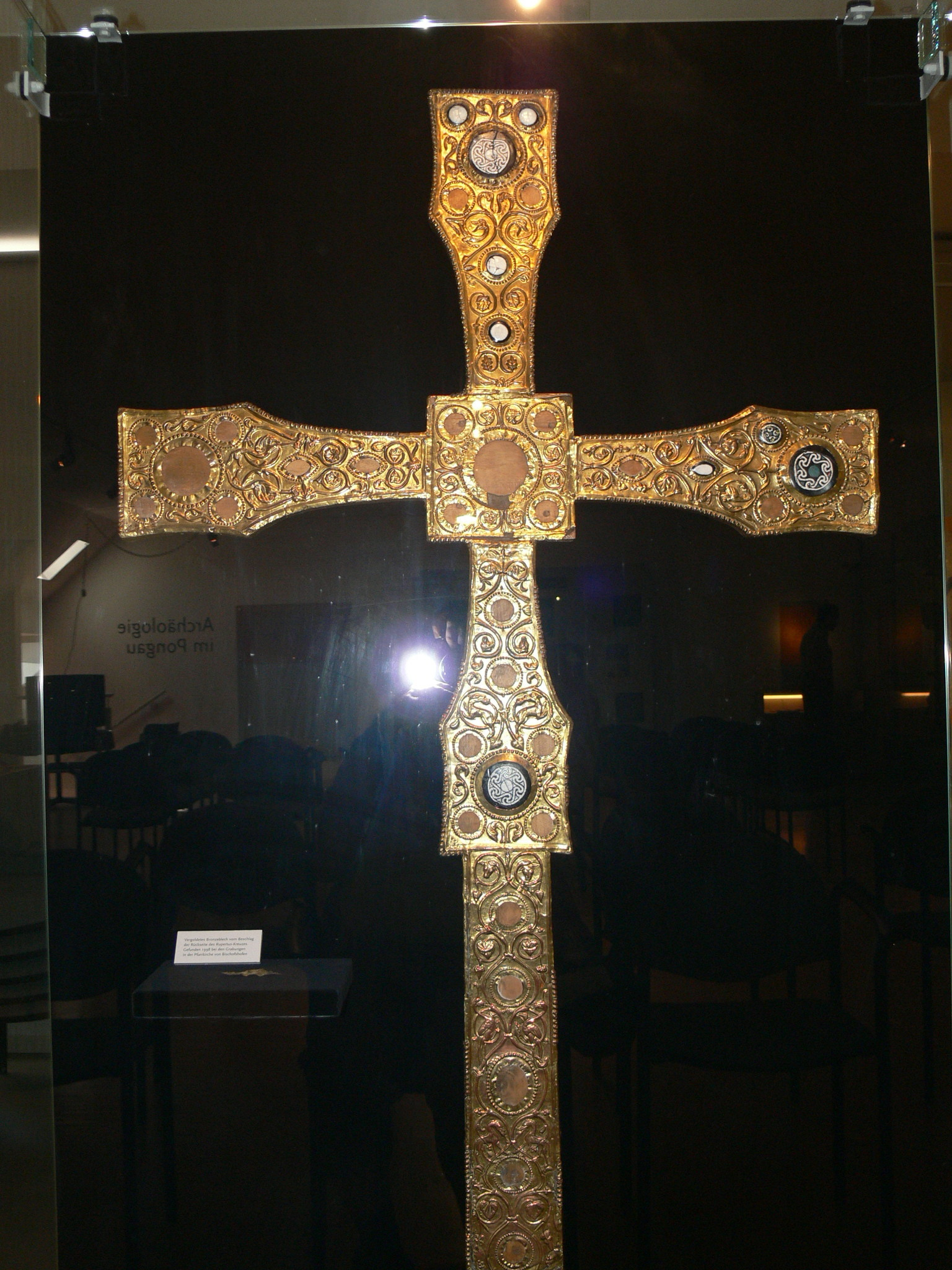
The Cross of Saint Rupert, 8th century, Northumbria

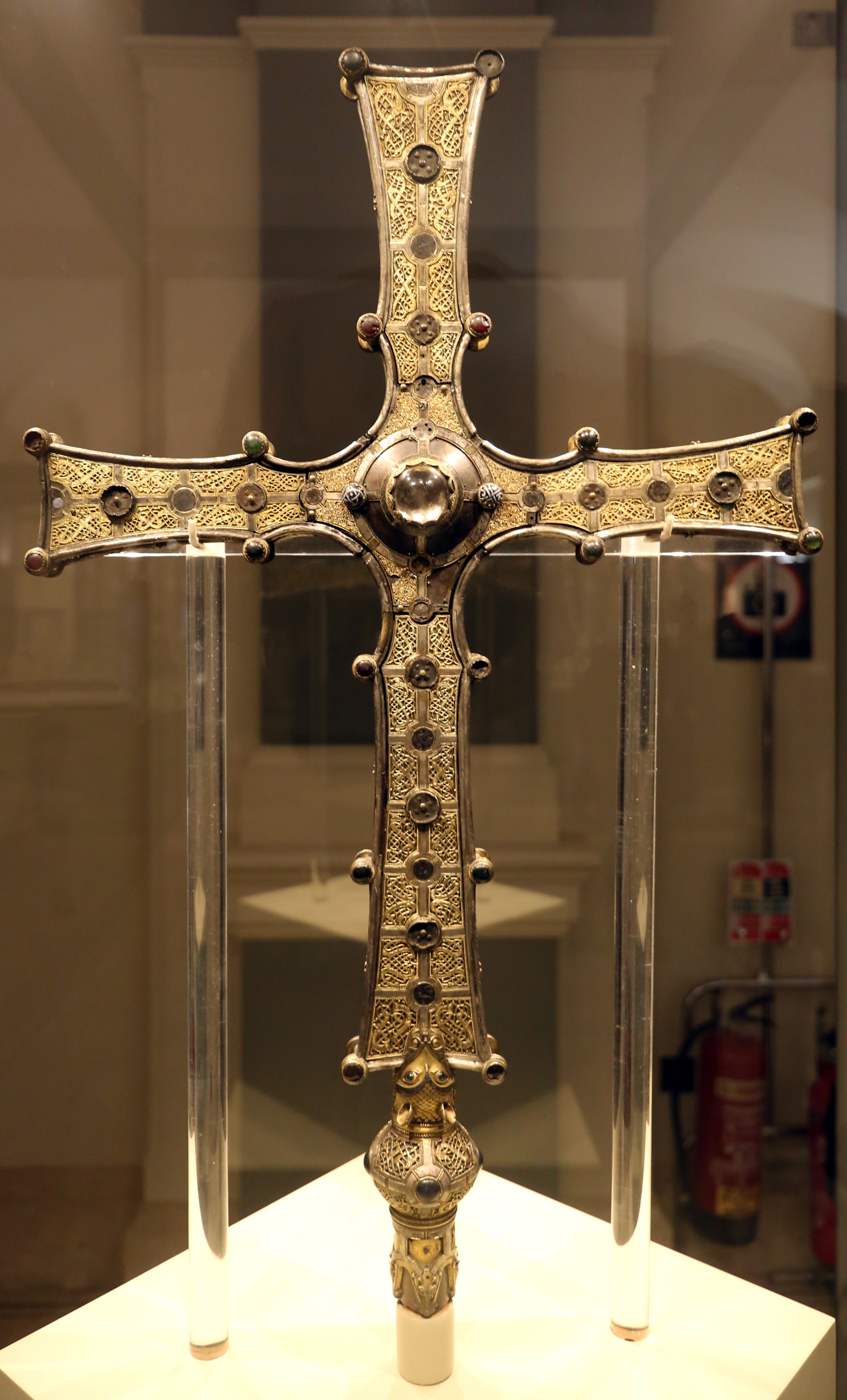
The Cross of Cong, c.1100–1125

== Sources ==
- Kelly, Eamonn. "The Treasury: content and context". Irish Arts Review (2002-), volume 28, No. 2, 2011. JSTOR 41202729
- Kelly, Eamonn. "The Tully Lough cross". Archaeology Ireland, volume 17, no. 2, issue 64, 2003. JSTOR 23321597
- Moss, Rachel. Medieval c. 400—c. 1600: Art and Architecture of Ireland. London: Yale University Press, 2014. ISBN 978-0-3001-7919-4
- Murray, Griffin. "Irish crucifixion plaques: a reassessment. In: Mullins, Juliet; Ni Ghradaigh, Jenifer (eds): Envisioning Christ on the Cross: Ireland and the Early Medieval West. University of Notre Dame: Thomas F.X. Noble, 2014
- Murray, Griffin. "The provenance of an Irish crucifixion plaque". Archaeology Ireland, volume 26, No. 4, Winter 2012. JSTOR 41202729
- "News: National Museum gets tough". Archaeology Ireland, volume 1, number 2, December 1987. JSTOR 20558250
