= Irish Gospels of St. Gall =

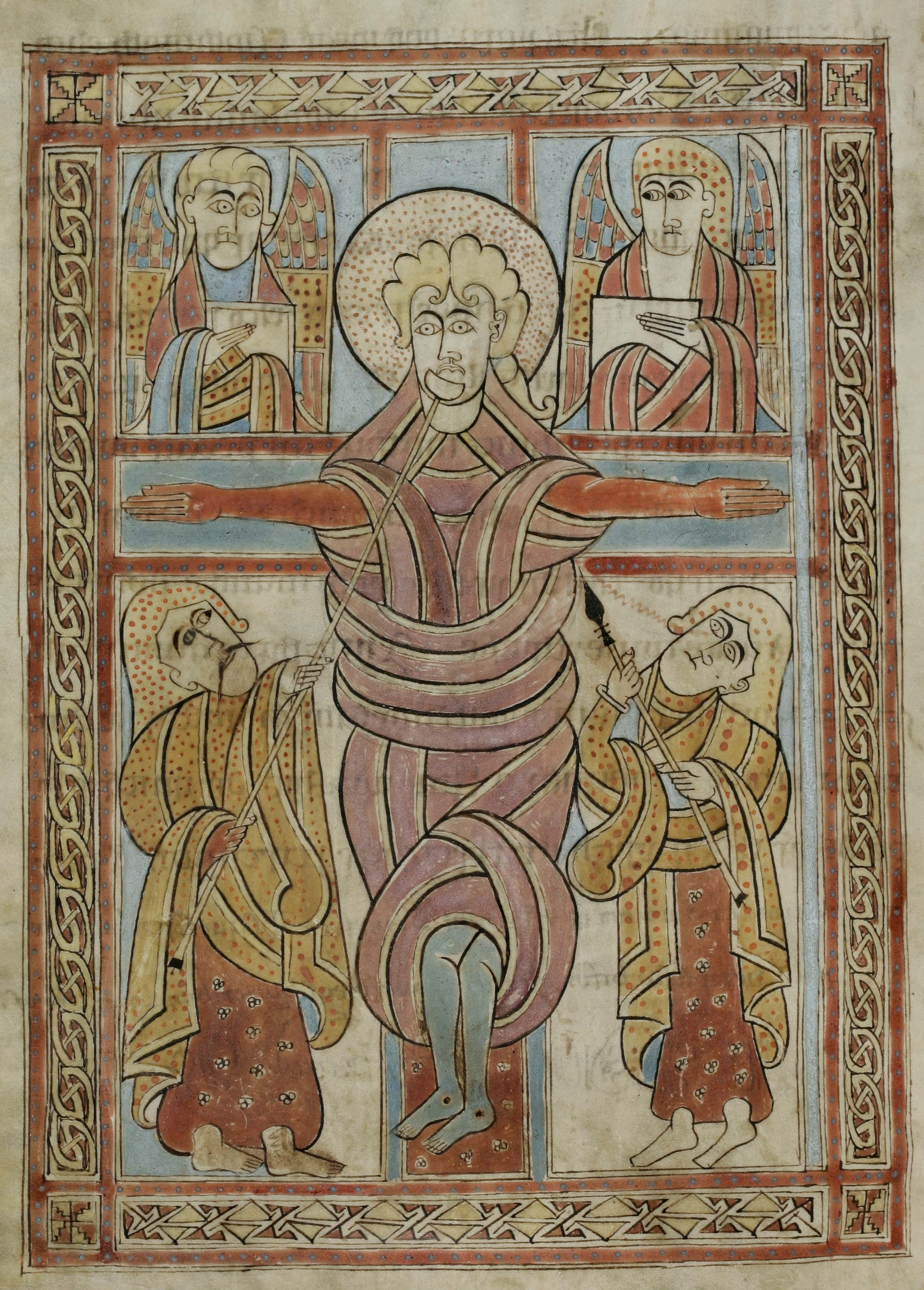
Crucifixion in the St. Gall Gospel Book

The Irish Gospels of St. Gall or Codex Sangallensis 51 is an 8th-century Insular Gospel Book, written in Ireland by Irish monks and currently located in the Abbey of St. Gall in Switzerland, where it is now in the Abbey library of St. Gallen as MS 51. It has 134 folios (that is, 268 pages). Amongst its eleven illustrated pages are a Crucifixion, a Last Judgement, a Chi Rho monogram page, a carpet page, and Evangelist portraits.

It is designated by 48 on the Beuron system, and is an 8th-century Latin manuscript of the New Testament. The text, written on vellum, is a version of the old Latin. The manuscript contains the text of the four Gospels on 134 parchment leaves 29.5 cm × 22.5 cm (11.6 in × 8.9 in). It is written in two columns, in Irish semi-uncials. It has been in the St Gall library since at least the 10th century, when it is recorded in the earliest catalogue.

The Latin text of the Gospel of John is a representative of the Western text-type. The text of the other Gospels represents the Vulgate version.

== Origin ==
The Irish Gospels preserved in the Abbey Library are among the finest illustrated manuscripts extant. Because of the square script and the use of minuscule for a liturgical text, O'Sullivan suggested that they might have originated in central Ireland, and Joseph Flahive dates them to around 780. They display a close stylistic affinity with the Faddan More Psalter discovered in 2006, almost miraculously, in a bog near Birr, which is also in the Irish midlands. Analysis of DNA taken from the manuscript's vellum has confirmed that it was produced in Ireland.

The manuscript itself offers no precise information about its place of origin. On page 265, however, there is an entry in a Carolingian minuscule that possibly dates back as far as the second half of the 9th century, apparently imitating the Irish script. This is a sign that the volume had reached the mainland by the 9th or 10th century at the latest and was probably already in St. Gallen. Although there is no clear evidence that it had anything to do with the donation of books by the Irish bishop Marcus and his nephew Móengal during the period between 849 and 872, the idea cannot be ruled out.

== Content ==
The manuscript contains the four gospels in the form of an Irish hybrid which draws on both Vetus Latina and the Vulgate. Striking from an artistic perspective are the facing pages with which each gospel begins. Each pair consists of an impressive portrait of the evangelist on the left and beautifully crafted incipit on the right. The equilibrium of these double-page compositions is one of the supreme accomplishments of Irish book art. The same quality is evident in a carpet page (p. 6), another decorative initial (p. 7), and depictions of the Crucifixion (p. 266) and the Last Judgment (p. 267) at the end of the book. The initial pages for the Gospels of Mark and John (pp. 78/79 and 208/209) differ in style from the others, so it can be assumed that two different illuminators were at work.

== Gallery ==
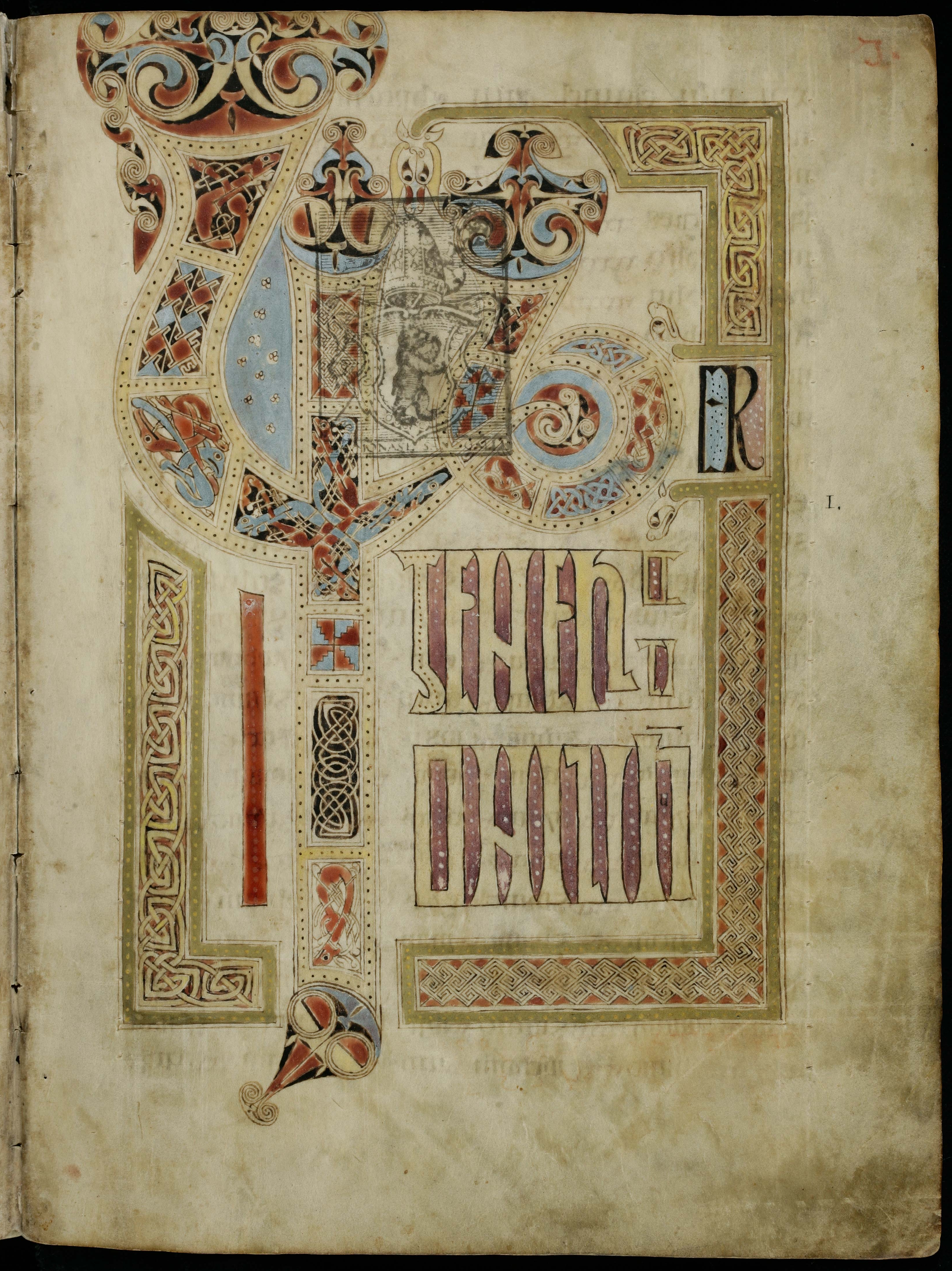
"Liber generationis", p 3

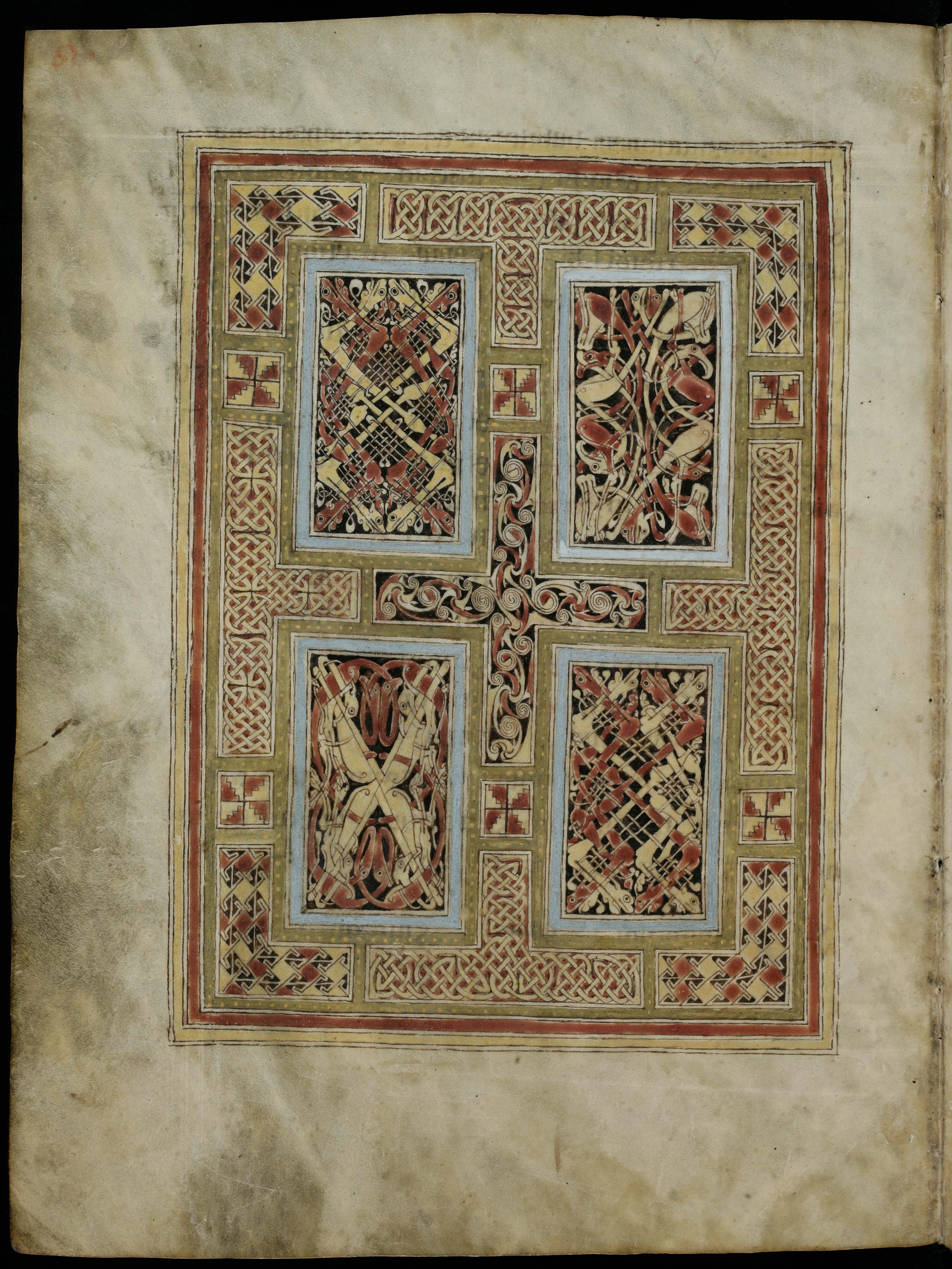
Carpet page, p. 6

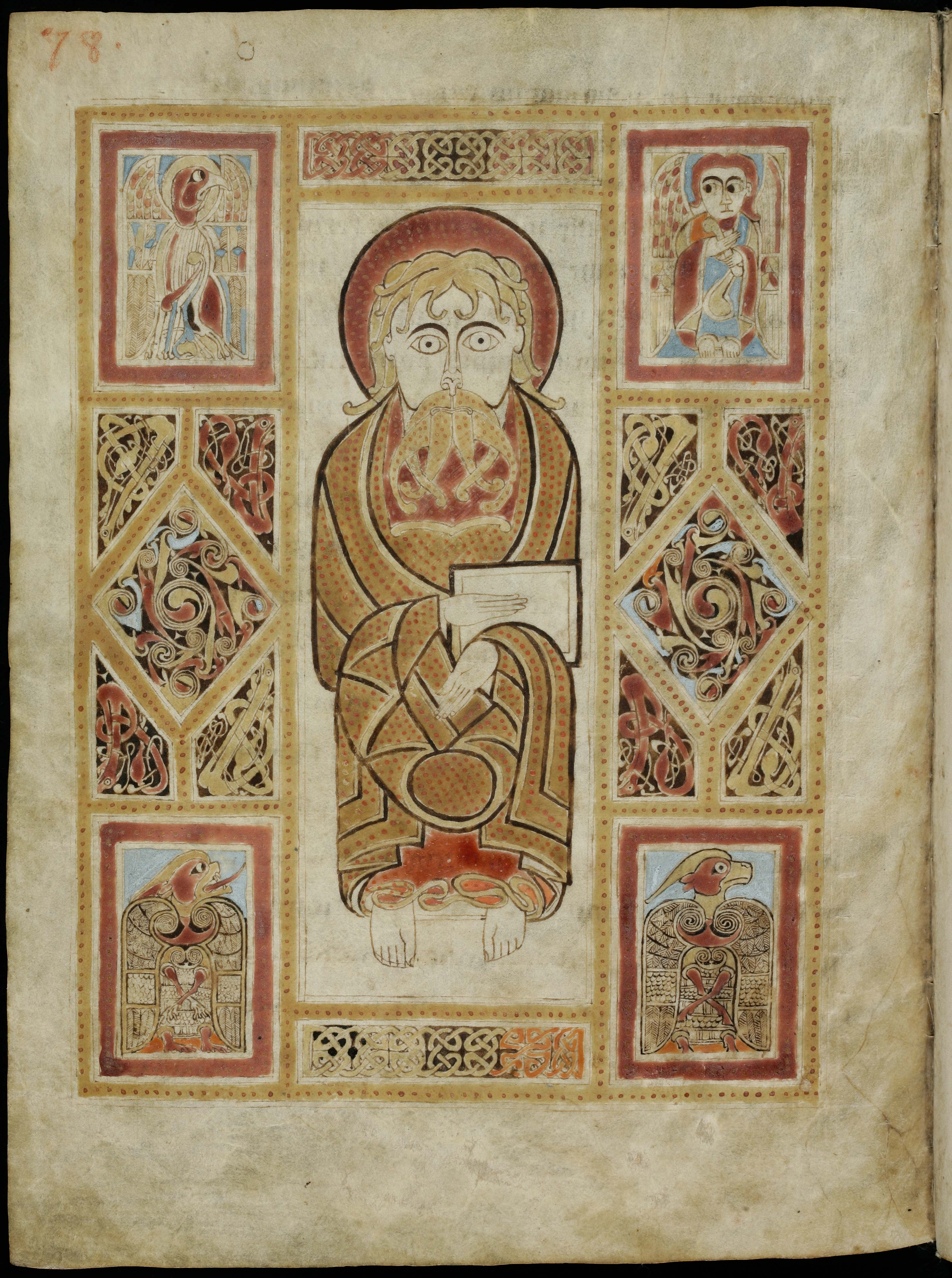
Saint Mark, p. 78

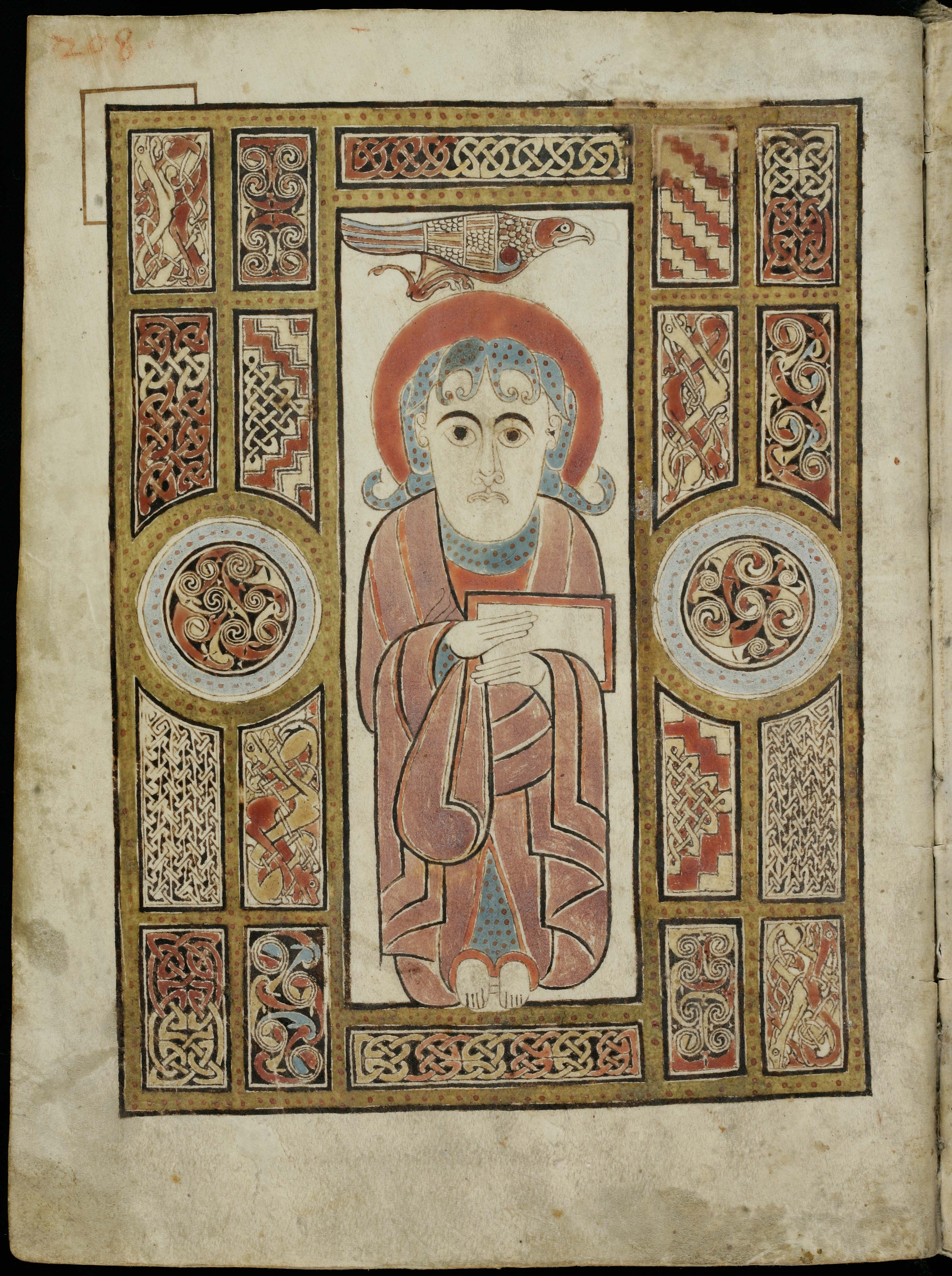
John the Evangelist, p. 208

== See also ==
- List of New Testament Latin manuscripts
