= Máire de Paor =

Irish historian and archaeologist, also TV researcher, presenter

- Máire de Paor
- Born: Máire MacDermott; 6 May 1925; Buncrana, County Donegal
- Died: 6 December 1994 (aged 69)

Máire de Paor (6 May 1925 – 6 December 1994), née MacDermott, was an Irish historian and archaeologist who also worked as a researcher and presenter for the national broadcaster RTÉ.

== Early life and education ==
Máire de Paor was born Máire MacDermott to Eamonn MacDermott and Delia MacVeigh in Buncrana, County Donegal, on 6 May 1925. She was educated in the Convent of Mercy in Buncrana before going to University College Dublin, where she completed a master's degree and a doctorate on early Christian archaeology and metalwork.

== Career ==
de Paor worked in the Department of Archeology in UCD from 1946 to 1958. She married Liam de Paor in 1946 and they had a daughter and four boys. They collaborated on a number of publications. de Paor published her papers in the Proceedings of the Royal Irish Academy, Archaeologia, Seanchas Armagh and Comhar. Her husband also worked in the university, and as a result of policies about married women, de Paor was forced to leave. Initially she lectured in the US, Canada, Scandinavia, France and the UK. She worked as lecturer in archaeology at Trinity College Dublin. The de Paors spent a year in Nepal on a UNESCO project in 1963.

de Paor worked as a freelance researcher for Radio Telefís Éireann until she was given a full time position in the 70s.

de Paor was elected a member of the Royal Irish Academy in 1960 and was a member of the Arts Council from 1973. She became a member of Conradh na Gaeilge from 1962. From 1968 she was working with Cumann Merriman, the Irish cultural organisation named after Brian Merriman; de Paor worked with the group as a director of the schools and spent four years as chairperson. In 1992 de Paor was appointed to the board of Amharclann de hÍde.

UCD created the Dr Máire de Paor Award for best PhD thesis.

== Personal life ==
Her biographer identifies her as a committed republican, socialist and feminist.

== Selected bibliography ==
- Françoise Henry. L'art irlandais, 1954
- Early Christian Ireland, 1958
- "The crosiers of St. Dympna and St. Mel and tenth century Irish metal-work", Dublin: Hodges, Figgis and Co., 1957 (in Proceedings of the Royal Irish Academy). JSTOR 25505072
- Ceist agam ort, bunaithe ar an gcúrsa comhrá An dochtúir sa teach, 1976
- Treasures of Irish Art, 1500 BC-1500 AD (contributor). New York: Metropolitan Museum of Art, 1977
- Early Irish Art. Dublin: Dept. of Foreign Affairs, 1979. ISBN 978-0-9064-0403-4
