= Stephaton =

Roman soldier

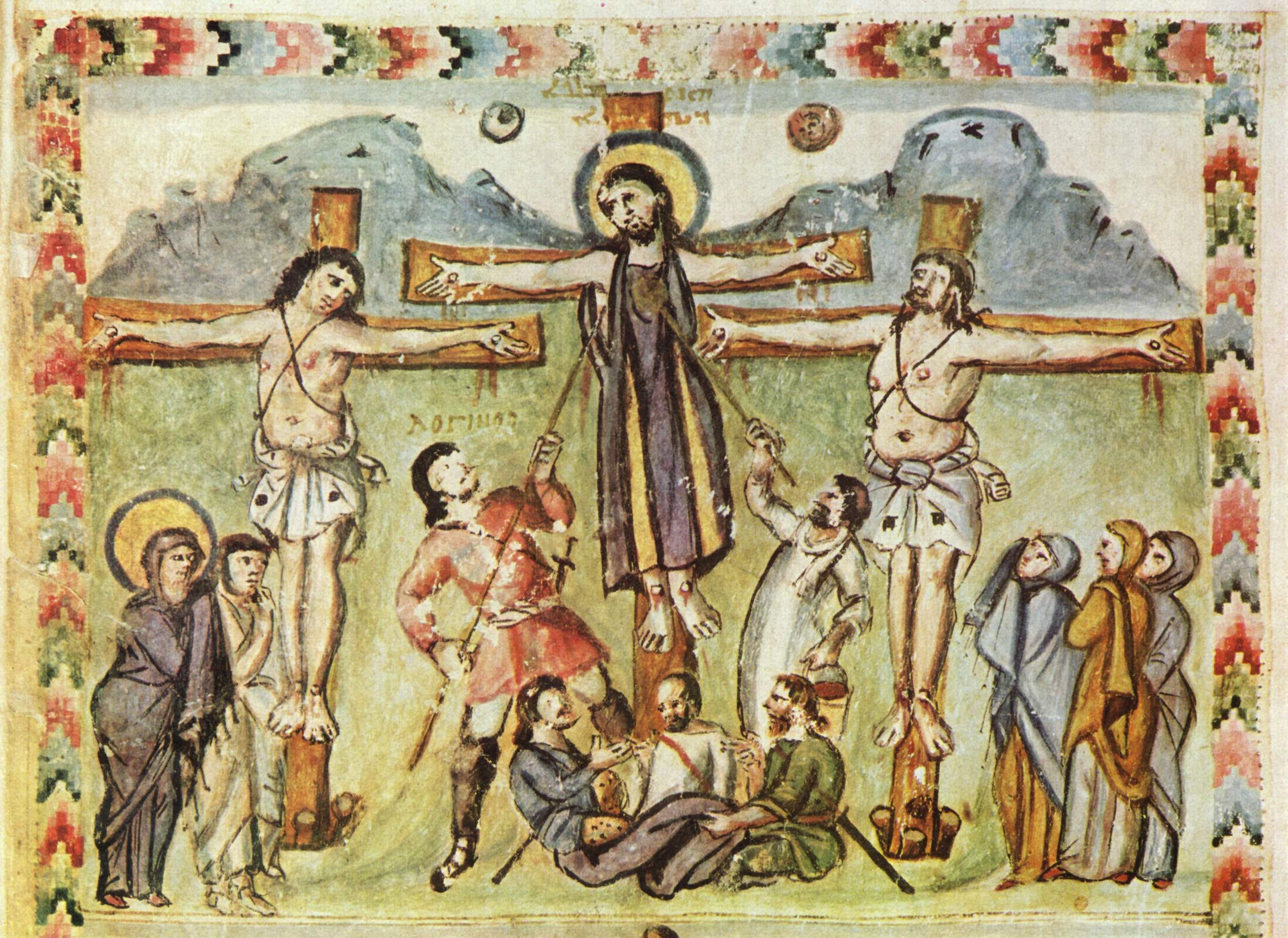
Stephaton, to the right of Jesus, in the earliest crucifixion in an illuminated manuscript, from the Syriac Rabbula Gospels, 586. Unlike Longinus, he is not named here

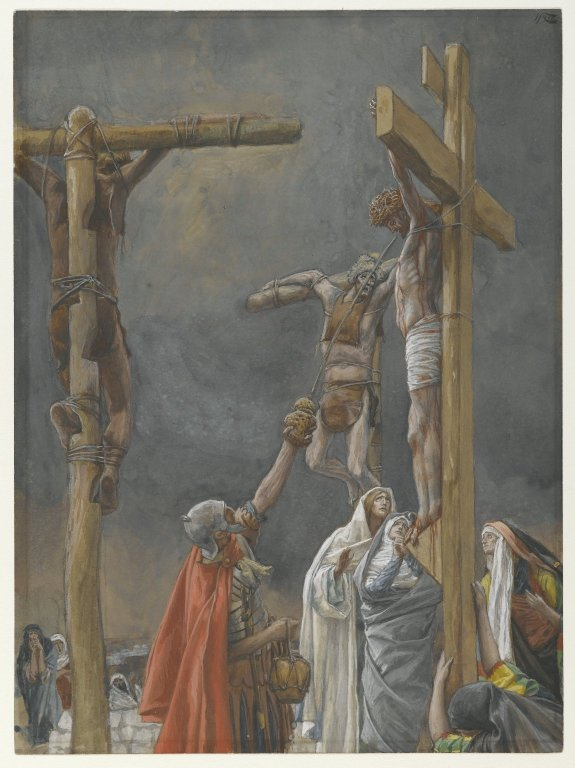
James Tissot's depiction. Here, the hyssop stick is used as a kind of straw, and "Stephaton" squeezes the sponge. (c. 1880, gouache over graphite on grey wove paper)

Stephaton, or Steven, is the name given in medieval Christian traditions to the Roman soldier or bystander, unnamed in the Bible, who offered Jesus a sponge soaked in vinegar wine at the Crucifixion. In later depictions of the Crucifixion, Stephaton is frequently portrayed with Longinus, the soldier who pierced Jesus' side with a spear.

The sponge in this Biblical narrative is not to be confused with a Xylospongium, a sponge that is soaked in vinegar attached to a stick the Romans used after defecating.

== Gospel accounts ==
The account of Jesus receiving a sponge soaked in vinegar while on the cross appears in all four of the canonical gospels, with some variation. In both Mark 15:35–36 and Matthew 27:47–48, just after Jesus says "My God, my God, why have you forsaken me", a bystander soaks a sponge in vinegar and raises it on a reed for Jesus to drink. Luke 23:36–37 mentions that the attendant soldiers offer Jesus vinegar while mocking him – moving the mocking motif that occurs earlier in Mark and Matthew to the Crucifixion. In John 19:28–30, Jesus declares "I thirst" (one of his last words) and is given the vinegar-soaked sponge "on hyssop".

The significance of the act is unclear, though it is usually interpreted as an act of mercy on the part of the soldiers (William Chester Jordan suggests that the word used for vinegar (oxos) may have been slang for wine). Others have theorised it may have been posca, a mixture of water, vinegar and wine consumed by common soldiers and the lower classes in the Roman world. The episode may also allude to Psalm 69:21: "In my thirst they gave me vinegar to drink."

== Medieval interpretation ==
Many medieval Christian writers saw the offering of vinegar wine as an act of torture rather than mercy. A tradition, supported by St. Augustine and other Church Fathers, developed that the sponge-bearer was a Jew.

== In art ==
The soldier who offered Jesus the sponge is often paired with Longinus, the name later given to the unnamed soldier who pierced Christ's side with a spear during the Crucifixion. It is not known when or how the name "Stephaton" originated for this character, though it had become common well before the end of the first millennium.

In an iconographic tradition originating in Byzantine art, and continuing in Carolingian and Ottonian art, in depictions of the Crucifixion, he was regularly shown alongside Longinus, with their actions shown simultaneously, though in the Biblical narrative, these took place at different times (Stephaton's occurs before Jesus' death, Longinus' occurred after.) This is also seen in Irish art Colum Hourihane and others suggest the images should not be read as a simple narrative, but rather a mix of symbolism and representation typical of medieval art.

Medieval Christian artists indicated that the sponge-bearer was irredeemably wicked (unlike Longinus), through conventions like showing him on Jesus' left-hand side, without a halo, and/or with some kind of physical deformity.

== Sources ==
- Schiller, Gertrud, Iconography of Christian Art, Vol. II, 1972 (English trans from German), Lund Humphries, London, ISBN 0-85331-324-5
