= Peter Harbison =

Irish archaeologist (1939–2023)

- Harbison in 2023
- Born: 14 January 1939; Dublin, Ireland
- Died: 30 May 2023 (aged 84); Dublin, Ireland
- Education: University College Dublin (BA); Marburg University (PhD)
- Occupations: Archaeologist; historian
- Spouse: Edelgard
- Children: 3 sons
- Parent(s): John Harbison; Sheelagh MacSherry

Peter Desmond Harbison (14 January 1939 – 30 May 2023) was an Irish archaeologist and author. He was Professor of Archaeology and a member (elected in 1979) of the Royal Irish Academy (Arts division), and the academy's Honorary Academic Editor. He became an honorary Fellow of Trinity College Dublin, an honorary member of the Royal Institute of the Architects of Ireland (RIAI).

He published numerous journal articles and over 36 books, the best known of which include his Guide to the National Monuments of Ireland (1970), The High Crosses of Ireland (1994), The Golden Age of Irish Art (1999) and Ireland's Treasures: 5000 Years of Artistic Expression (2004).

== Life and career ==
Peter Harbison was born in Dublin on 14 January 1939 to John Austin Harbison and Sheelagh (née MacSherry). He obtained a Bachelor of Arts in early Irish history at University College Dublin in 1959 and later studied in Freiburg, Germany, before earning a doctorate in Celtic archaeology at the University of Marburg in 1964.

Harbison's best known publication became his three-volume The High Crosses of Ireland from 1992. In addition to his monument guide Harbison became widely known through numerous publications aimed at the general public, which provide an introduction to the early history of Ireland and its artistic monuments.

In 1978, with Homan Potterton, director of the National Gallery of Ireland, and Jeanne Sheehy, he published his first art volume, "Irish Art and Architecture" (Thames & Hudson), where he surveyed Irish art up to 1600 AD. His 1988 book Pre-Christian Ireland won the British Archaeological Book Award in the same year. Other important art volumes include The Golden Age of Irish Art which covers Medieval art in the period between 600 and 1200 AD.

He died on 30 May 2023 aged 84 in Blackrock, Dublin, predeceased by his wife Edelgard and survived by his three sons.

== Sources ==
- Stalley, Roger. "Reviewed Work(s): The High Crosses of Ireland, an Iconographical and Photographic Survey by Peter Harbison". Irish Arts Review Yearbook, volume 10, 1994. pp. 258-260. JSTOR 20492803
