= Griffin Murray =

Irish archaeologist

Griffin Murray is an Irish archaeologist specialising in medieval Ireland and Insular art, especially metalwork in the period between 400–1550 AD. His interests include identifying and contextualizing the social role of medieval craftsmen, Viking art and the relations between insular and Scandinavian craftsmen, and he is a leading expert on both house-shaped shrines and insular croziers.

His doctoral thesis "The Cross of Cong and Church Metalwork from Romanesque Ireland" was completed in 2007. Griffin and Aina Heen-Pettersen won the Society for Medieval Archaeology's 2018 Martyn Jope Award for a paper they co-wrote titled "An Insular Reliquary from Melhus: The Significance of Insular Ecclesiastical Material in Early Viking-Age Norway". As of 2021, Murray lectures on museum studies and medieval archaeology at University College Cork, Ireland. He was elected as a Fellow of the Society of Antiquaries of London in 2021.

== Publications (selected) ==
=== Books (authored) ===
- The Medieval Treasures of County Kerry. Tralee: Kerry County Museum, 2010. ISBN 978-0-956-5714-0-3

=== Books (contributed) ===
- Moss, Rachel (ed). Medieval c. 400—c. 1600: Art and Architecture of Ireland. New Haven, CT: Yale University Press, 2014. ISBN 978-0-3001-7919-4
- Hourihane, Colum (ed). Irish Art Historical Studies in honour of Peter Harbison, 2004. Department of Art and Archaeology, Princeton University. ISBN 978-1-8518-2847-0

=== Journals ===
- "The history and provenance of two early medieval crosiers ascribed to Clonmacnoise". Dublin: Proceedings of the Royal Irish Academy: Archaeology, Culture, History, Literature, 2021
- "Irish crucifixion plaques: a reassessment". In: Mullins, Juliet; Ni Ghradaigh, Jenifer (eds):Envisioning Christ on the Cross: Ireland and the Early Medieval West. University of Notre Dame: Thomas F.X. Noble, 2014
- "Insular-type crosiers: their construction and characteristics. 'Making and Meaning in Insular Art". Proceedings of the Fifth International Conference on Insular Art, 2007
- "A note on the Provenance of the Breac Maodhóg". The Journal of the Royal Society of Antiquaries of Ireland, volume 135, 2005. JSTOR 25549932
- "The Provenance of the County Antrim Crozier". Ulster Journal of Archaeology, third series, vol. 67, 2008. JSTOR 41220771
- "Lost and Found: The Eleventh Figure on Saint Manchan's Shrine". The Journal of the Royal Society of Antiquaries of Ireland, Vol. 133, 2003. JSTOR 25509113

=== Online lectures ===
- "Colmcille 1500 Lecture Series: St Columba’s crosier: power and devotion in medieval Ireland". National Museum of Ireland – Archaeology, December 2021
- "St Manchán's Shrine: Art and Devotion in Twelfth Century Ireland". Offaly History, 17 May 2021
- "The River Laune (Inisfallen) Crozier. National Museum of Ireland, 2019
