= Shrine of Miosach =

11th-century Irish cumdach (book shrine)

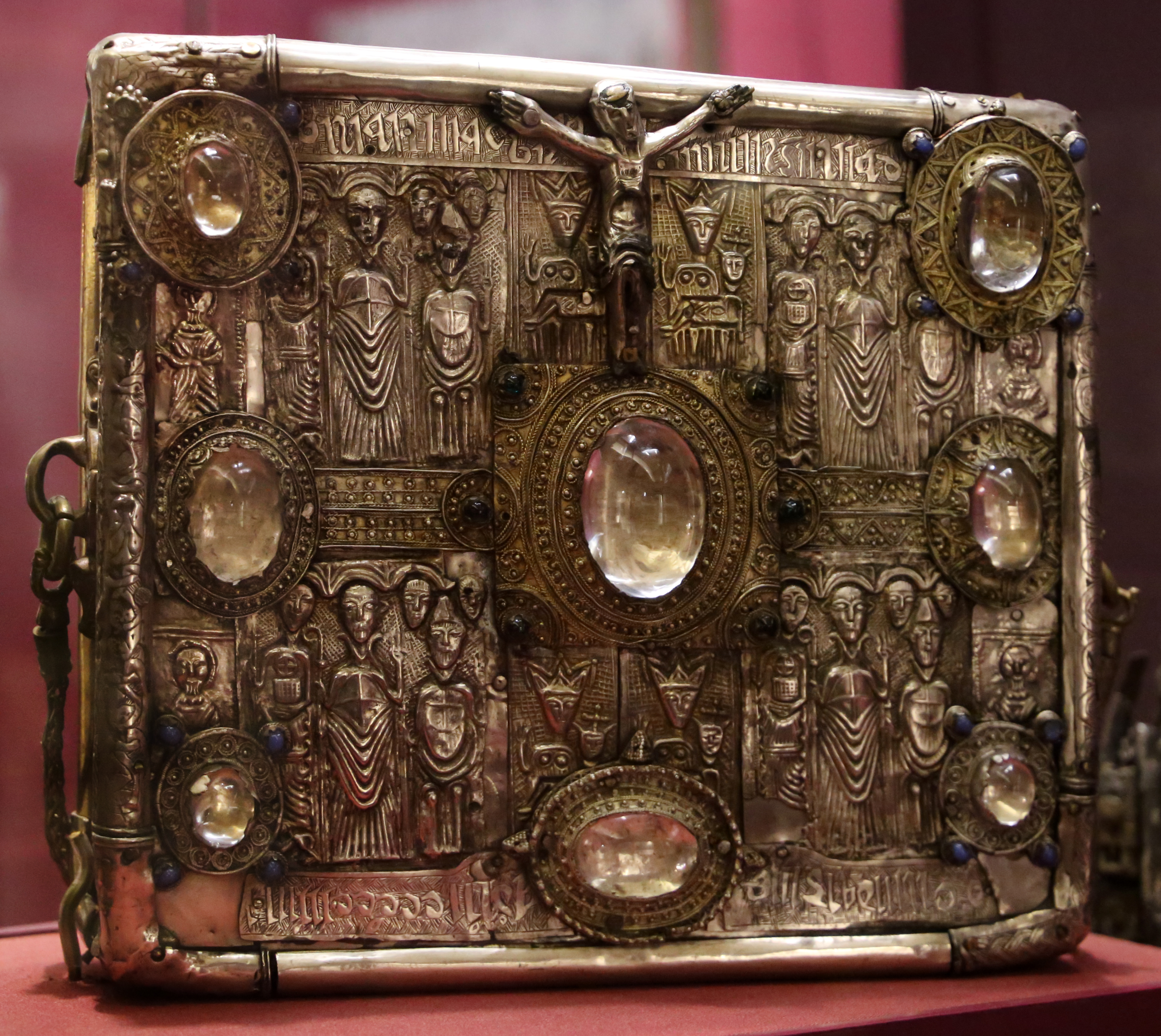
- The frontispiece, added in 1532
- Material: Yew-wood, bronze, silver, enamel
- Size: height 26.6cm, width 23.2cm, depth 6.3cm.
- Created: late 11th and early 16th centuries
- Discovered: Clonmany, County Donegal, Ireland
- Present location: National Museum of Ireland, Dublin

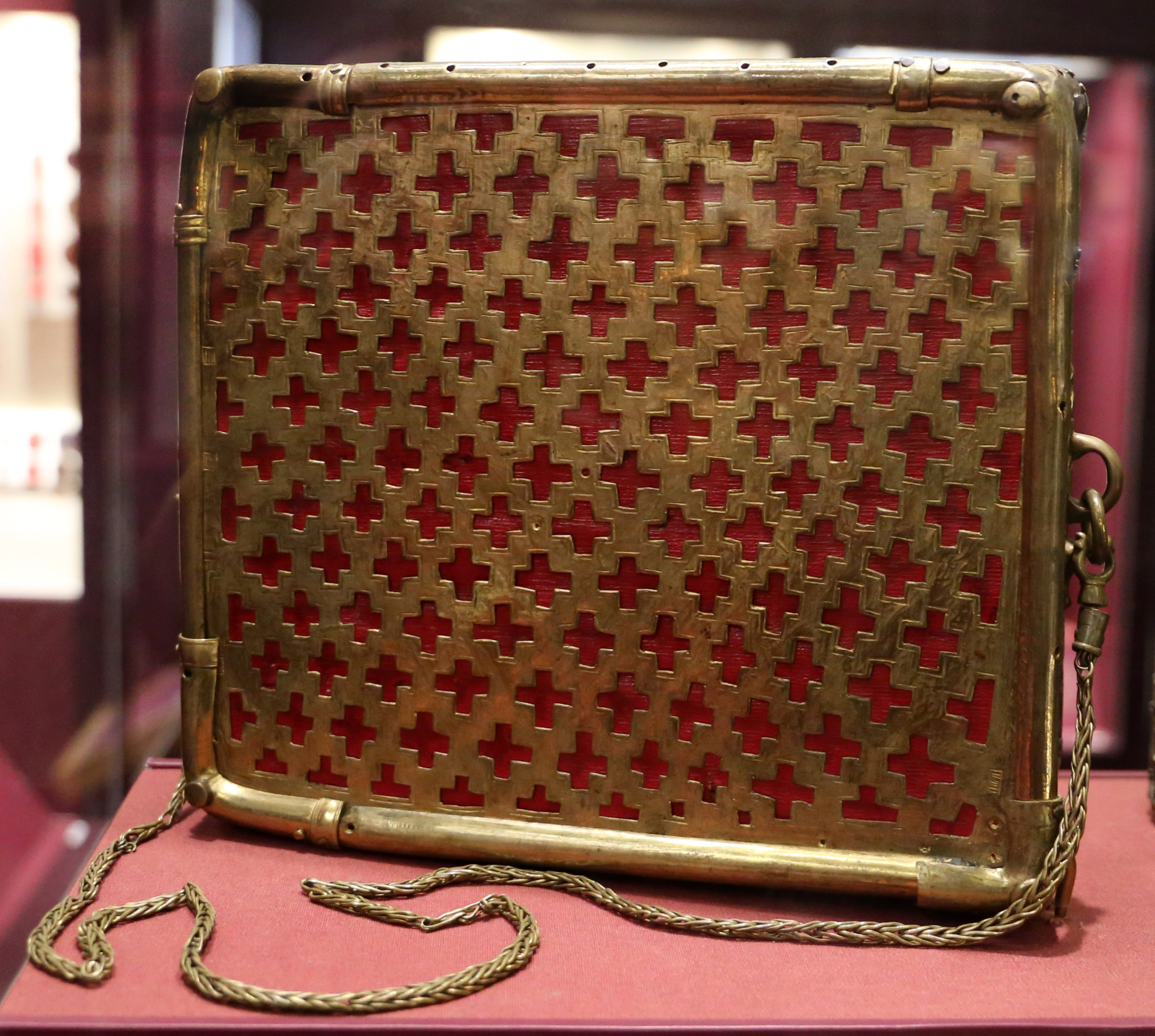
Reverse view

The Shrine of Miosach (also known as The Misach, Irish: Míosach) is an elaborately ornamented 11th-century Irish cumdach (book shrine). It originates from Clonmany, north County Donegal, and is first mentioned in the 1165 Irish annals. It is dated to the late 11th century, when it probably contained a manuscript with psalms or extracts from a Gospel. However, the shrine was empty when first described in detail in the 18th century. It was originally associated with St Cairneach, patron saint of Dulane, County Meath, but by the late medieval period had become part of the cult of the abbot and missionary Colm Cille (521-59 AD).

The shrine was heavily re-worked in the 16th century; in 1534 the goldsmith Brian O'Morrison added a front cover and side plates adorned with semi-precious stones, and reliefs including the crucified Christ, depictions of the crowned Virgin and Child, and the three patron saints of Ireland: St. Bridget, St. Patrick and Colm Cille. O'Morrison fixed his additions to the wooden core with nails.

As with the cumdach holding the Cathach of St. Columba, in the Middle Ages it was carried into battle like a standard. It is held by the National Museum of Ireland, Dublin, in its archaeology building on Kildare Street.

== Description ==
During the 11th and 12th centuries, Irish metalworkers of the first rank tended to focus on highly prized reliquaries of different types, including cumdachs, bell shrines, crosiers and reliquary crosses, which form the majority of surviving artworks from this period. Bronze was used as the core metal and was often ornamented with reliefs, jewels, gold and silver leaf, filigree and inscriptions. The influence of Viking art, especially the Ringerike style, becomes apparent in work produced from 1072 AD, as the influence of the Norse settlements on the coastal towns spread inwards across the island. In contrast, Irish metalwork from this period, when the craft was seen as at the forefront of visual art, shows few influences from contemporary developments in English or mainland European regions, even though Irish and English ecclesiasticals were in close contact.

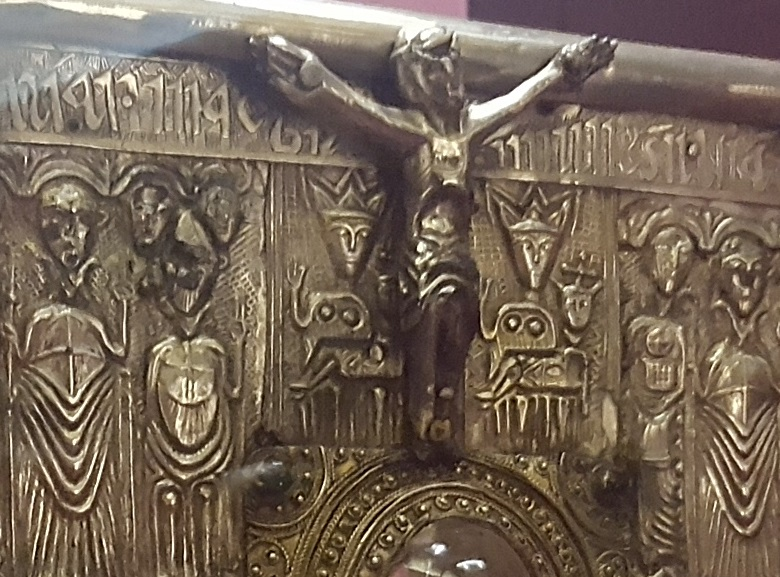
Detail of the upper center of the front cover, with crucifixion and two Madonna and Child images (in the smaller panels on either side of the cross)

The Shrine of Miosach consists of a rectangular, 11th-century wooden box decorated in the 16th century with extensive, ornate metal plates and mountings, and is fixed to the wooden core with nails. The early object may have been built to hold a relic or religious texts such as psalms or extracts from a Gospel, and would have been sized to suit the particular manuscript or relic. It was empty when first described in the 18th century, and there is no surviving record of what it may have held. Like most cumdachs—a format only found in Ireland and Scotland— it was designed to enclose and protect a relic or text in its chamber, while instilling, according to the art and architecture historian Rachel Moss, "wonder in the observer". Its dating to the last quarter of the 11th century is based on stylistic similarities to the 1084 AD cumdach built to contain the Cathach of St. Columba. It still has the original metal cord used for carrying it; the length of which indicates that it was probably intended to be worn around the neck. There are late 11th century cast copper alloy plates on each side, decorated with openwork zoomorphic illustrations, whose designs show the influence of the Ringerike style.

On commission from a member of the then dominant Ulster O'Domhnnaill family, the Shrine of Miosach's front cover was added in 1534 by the goldsmith Brian O'Morrison. He signed the work with an inscription in Latin, which was translated by the Irish artist, antiquary, archaeologist and collector George Petrie as "Briain ua Muirguissan covered me, anno M.CCCCC.XXXIIII". Moss believes that "covered me" should instead be read as "who enshrines me". O'Morrison added twelve plates (in three arrangements of four different sizes) to the front, with depictions of saints including the crowned Virgin and Child in the smaller inner panels, and St. Bridget, St. Patrick and Colm Cille in four large panels. Located in the upper centre of the front cover, in the space between the plates, is a relief of the crucified Christ. The front is further decorated by eight large cabochon quartz (rock crystal) gemstones. These semi-precious crystals were in vogue at the time, and probably replaced similar glass stones. The stones may have acted as lapidaries, that is, they were chosen and placed based on their symbolic meaning, which may have tied in with the text held in the interior chamber.

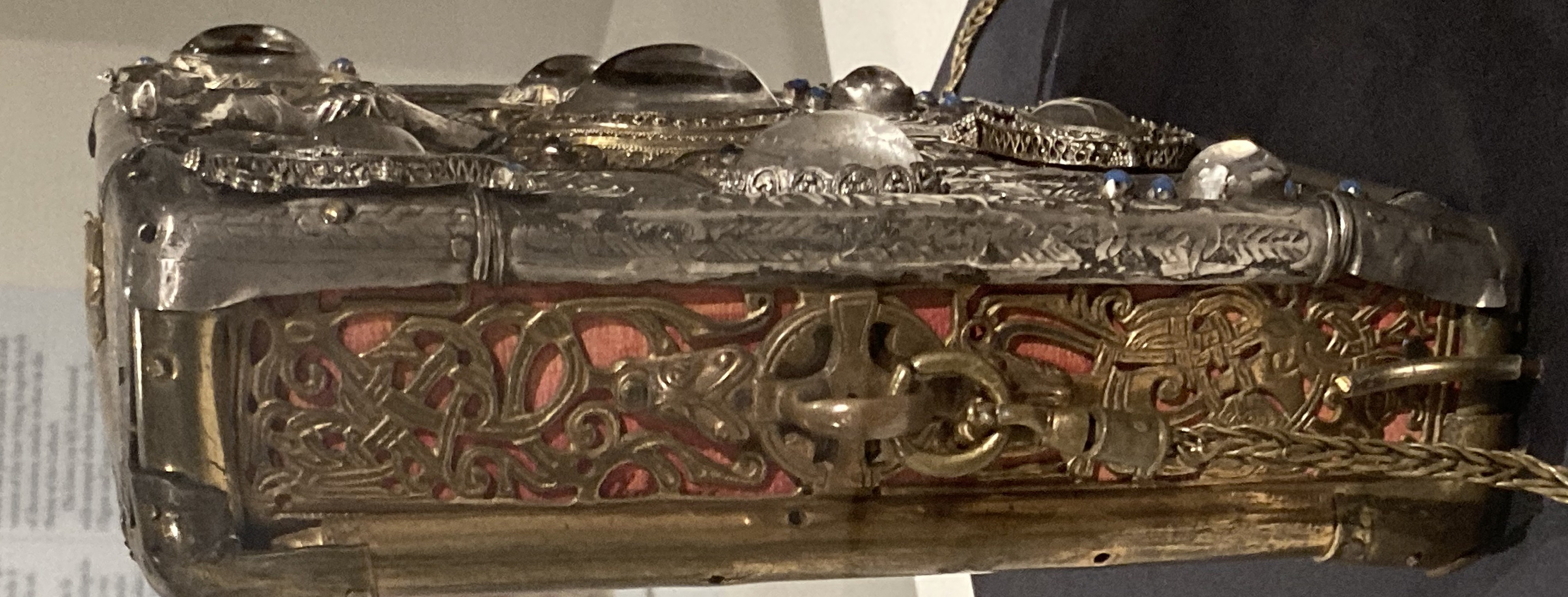
Right-hand side

Moss notes that, as with other 16th-century refurbishments of 10th- and 11th-century objects such as the Domnach Airgid and the casing for the Cathach psalter, the goldsmiths were mindful to incorporate elements of the original object, "suggesting a concern with maintaining the antique character of the pieces". This can be seen in how the front cover in many 16th-century reworkings, including this work, resemble 10th- and 11th-century illuminated manuscripts and high crosses, in that they are characterised by a surface divided into quadrants separated by raised bands, which the later artists usually made from bronze or silver.

The overall workmanship is, according to Moss, of a "formal and rigid style". Petrie had a similar view, and considered the other surviving cumdach, the Domnach Airgid, to be of a "purer style of art, and [of] more perfect execution" than the original metalwork on the Miosach shrine. According to the art historian Paul Mullarkey, the metalwork on some of the sides is of variable quality. He writes that some of the 16th-century craftsmen were "somewhat clumsy in [their] layout and execution of the zoomorphic[s], and this shows that not all commissions were of high quality."

== Provenance ==
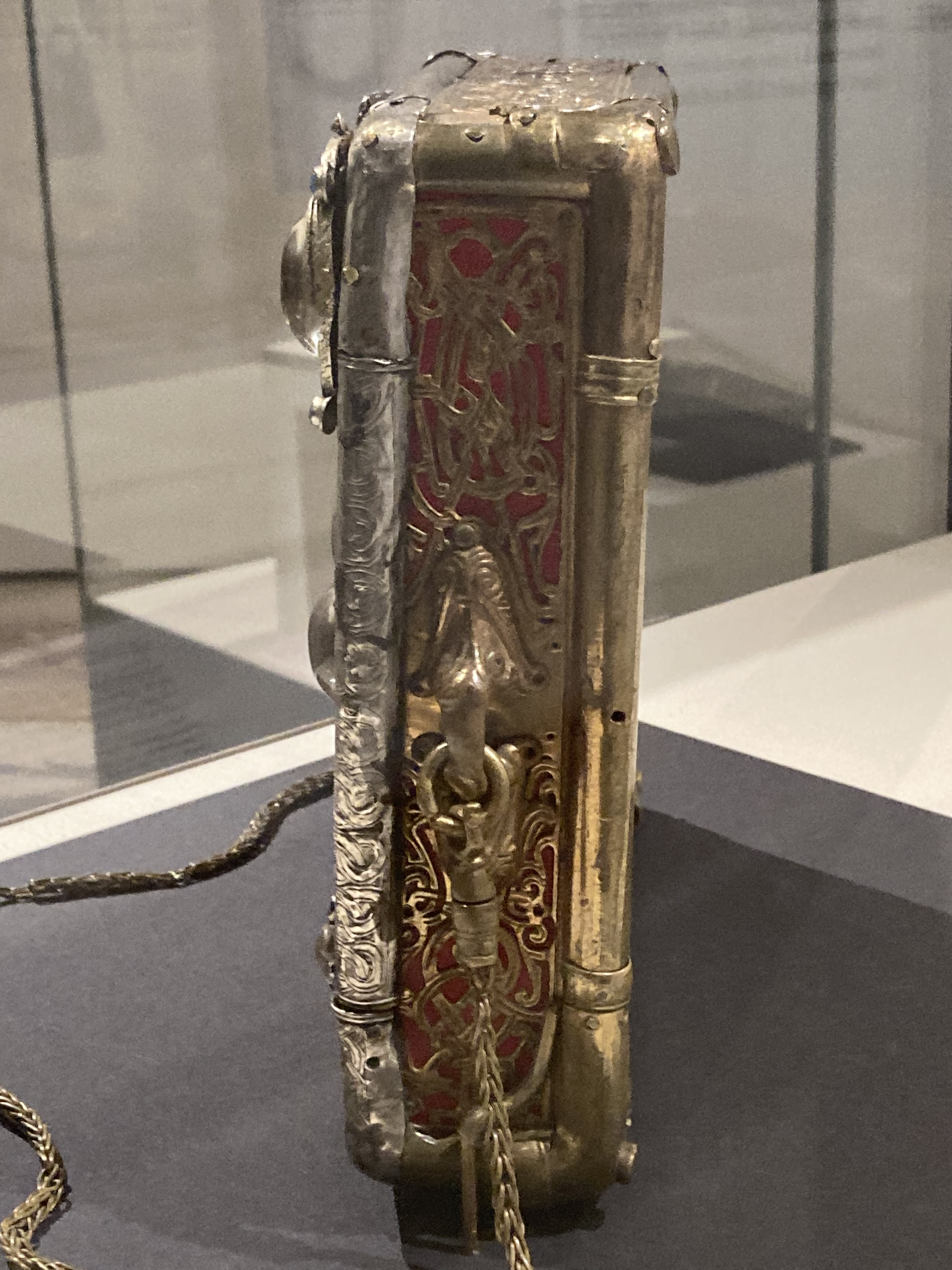
Left-hand side

The shrine is first mentioned in Irish annals dating from 1165. According to records from an enquiry into the object in 1609, it was then in the townland of Fahan, near the Donegal parish of Clonmany, having been recently obtained from bishop Thomas Barnard of Derry. It was acquired by William Barnard, Bishop of Derry, or his son Thomas Barnard, Bishop of Killaloe and Kilfenora, in the mid-18th century. When described by Petrie c. 1850–1853, it had been in the collection of St. Columba's College in Dublin since 1843, following its gifting by Edwin Wyndham-Quin, Lord of Dunraven that year.

The earliest, modern and full description and account was made by William Betham (not the bishop) in his 1826 book Irish Antiquarian Researches, although Charles Vallancey had covered the shrine in his nine-volume Collectanea De Rebus Hibernicis (1770 until he died in 1804); some of Betham's theories were later refuted. Notably, Petrie dismissed Betham's idea that the word "Miosach" is derived from a Hebrew root, calling the idea "totally absurd and groundless". Similarly the scholar and collector William Stokes found Betham's analysis lacking in knowledge and wildly inaccurate (for example Betham interpreted that the "M" in the M.CCCCC.XXXIIII inscription signified "DOMINI"). Stokes wrote it was fortunate that the shrine was offered for sale in London soon after Betham's description, as otherwise "its history would be, in consequence of Sir William Betham's ignorant notice of it, wholly lost."

Writing in 1868, Stokes noted that rather than referring to a family name, the word "Miosach" may refer to a calendar.

The Shrine of Miosach had been on loan to the archaeology department of the National Museum of Ireland since 1984, until it was purchased from St Columba's College in 2000 for £1.6 million.

== Condition ==
The shrine underwent a heavy restoration in the late 19th century. A number of elements were lost during this process, including the primary inscription, which is thought to have been on the reverse.
