= Stowe Missal =

8th-9th century Irish illuminated gospel

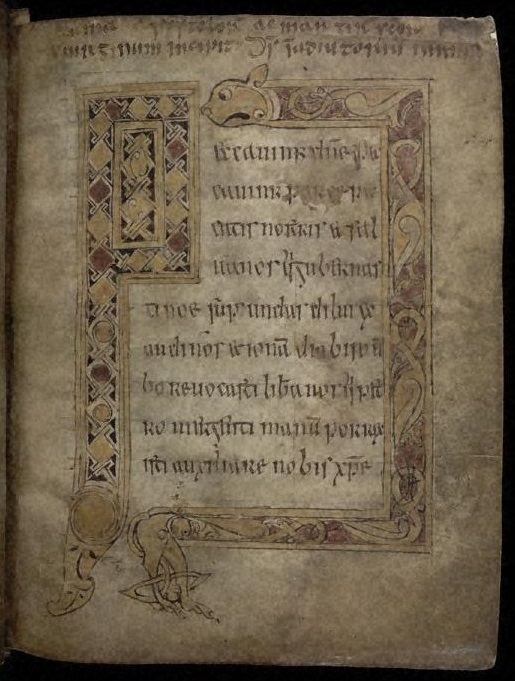
Folio 12 r. 150 x 120mm

The Stowe Missal (sometimes known as the Lorrha Missal), which is, strictly speaking, a sacramentary rather than a missal, is a small Irish illuminated manuscript written mainly in Latin with some Old Irish in the late eighth or early ninth century, probably after 792.

== History ==
It was completed in Tallaght Monastery, not long after the death of Máel Ruain and then carried by an anchorite called Máel Dithruib to the monasteries at Terryglass and Lorrha.

In the mid-11th century, it was annotated and some pages rewritten at Lorrha Monastery in County Tipperary, Ireland. Between 1026 and 1033 the manuscript was encased within a protective cumdach (a reliquary book-shrine), which was refurbished and embellished a number of times in the late medieval period, in particular before 1381, the year of death of Pilib O'Ceinneidigh (Philip O'Kennedy), Lord of Ormond, who then had possession of the shrine.

The manuscript and shrine had been found inside a stone wall at Lackeen Castle near Lorrha in the eighteenth century, where they had been hidden for centuries from Norman and later Protestant attackers, as well as Irish looters. The claim that they left Ireland after about 1375 and were collected on the Continent in the eighteenth century has been discredited.

It is known as the "Stowe" Missal as it reappeared in the eighteenth century as part of the Stowe manuscripts collection formed by George Nugent-Temple-Grenville, 1st Marquess of Buckingham at Stowe House. When the collection was bought by the nation in 1883, it and the other Irish manuscripts were handed over to the Royal Irish Academy in Dublin, where it remains, catalogued as MS D II 3. The cumdach was later transferred with the rest of the academy's collection of antiquities to the National Museum of Ireland (museum number 1883, 614a).

== Manuscript ==
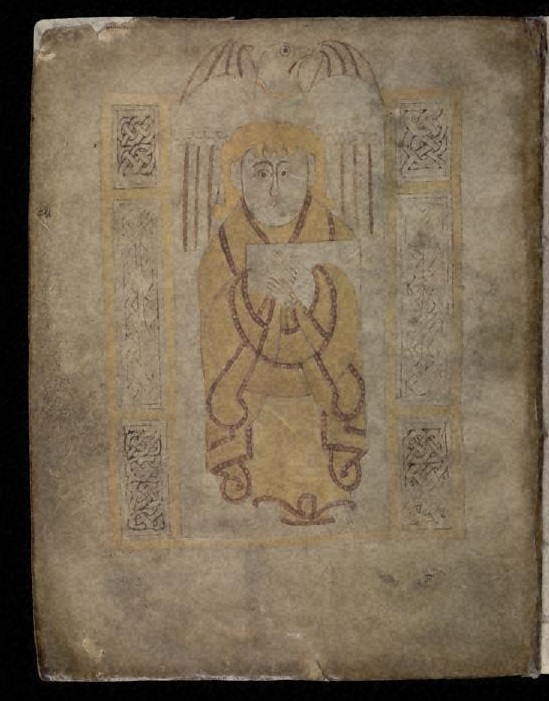
Evangelist portrait fol 11 v

There are 67 folios, measuring 15 cm x 12 cm. It is mostly written in Latin; only the last three folios are in Old Irish. These contain a short treatise on the Mass and, on the last page, folio 67v, three spells "against injury to the eye, thorns, and disease of the urine". The Latin sections contain extracts from the Gospel of John (opening with f 1), which were probably from another manuscript and are the most heavily illuminated, then the order of Mass and some special Masses (f 12), the Order of Baptism and of Communion for the newly baptised (f 46v), and the Order for the Visitation of the Sick and Last Rites (f 60). The original manuscript is dated to before 800 based on the inclusion of prayers for St. Ruain (d. 792); his monastery in Tallaght, in today's County Dublin is the most likely place where it was first copied.

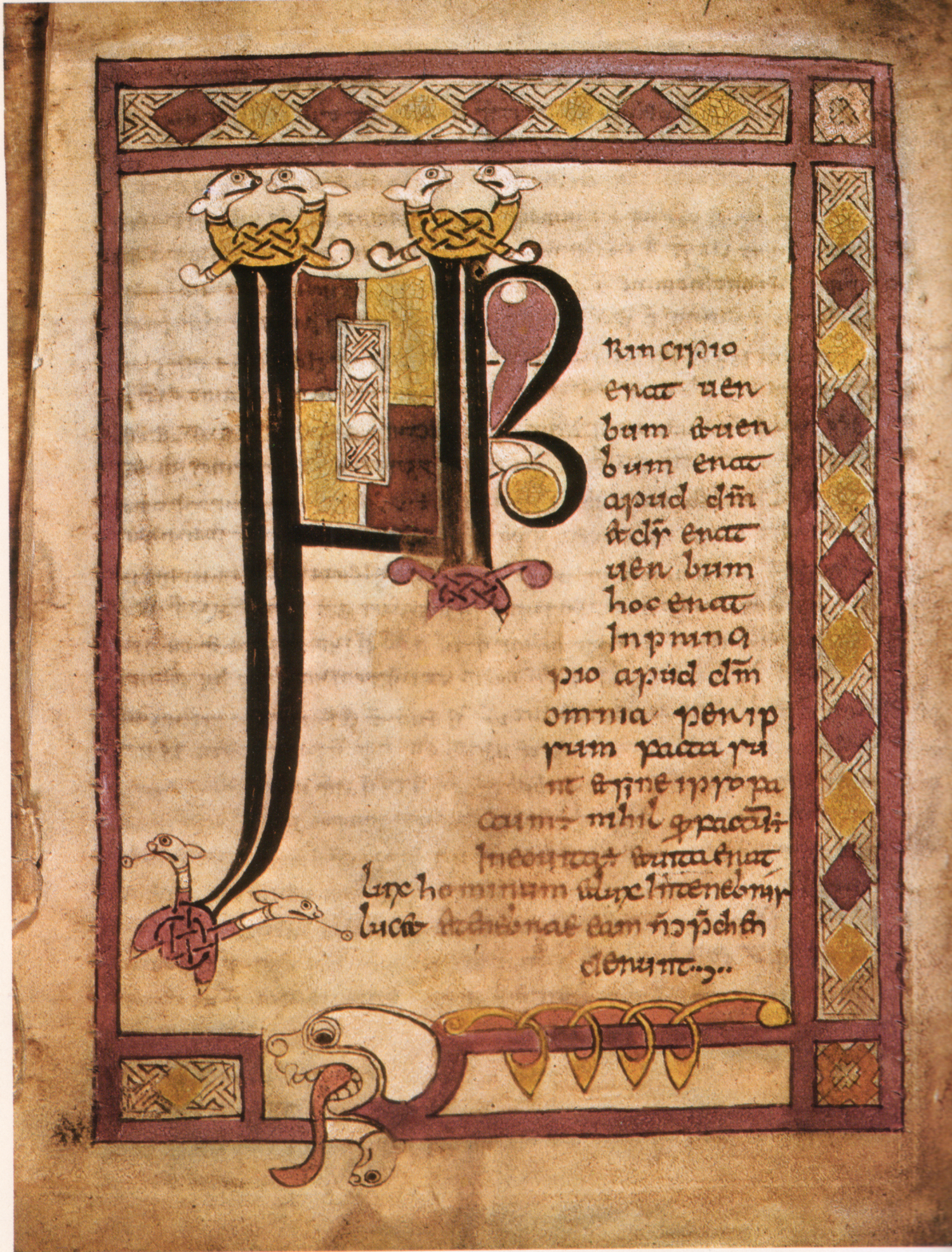
folio 1r initial page

The version of the mass used is thought to be older than the manuscript, and reflects the early usage of Celtic Christianity. The five original scribes of the Missal wrote in an angular majuscule script. A more cursive hand was used by a scribe signing himself Moél Caích (f 37) who revised several pages and added to the mixture of Gallican and Roman elements found in the text of the prayers. A later scribe, working before 1033, decorated the plain initials with heads and other designs using a pointed pen. The dating to before 1033 for the later phase is assumed as that was the year Find Ua Dungalaig, the presumed commissioner of the shrine of the missal, died.

A few initials are decorated, notably on f 1, where extracts from John contain a "crude" full page evangelist portrait of the saint with his symbol of the eagle, decorated with Insular interlace. The lower end of the page contains the body of an elongated animal. Apart from the eagle, it is rather similar to the portrait of John in the Book of Mulling, and its style has been compared to the eighth century Lindisfarne Gospels. Other folio initials are of the "knotted wire" type (f 48r & 51r). Two folios show human faces within the letters O (f 12v) and D, with the latter resembling anthropomorphic designs in the Book of Kells.

The manuscript's small size indicates that it was intended to be a portable "pocket book" that could be carried by a cleric for mass in nearby towns and villages, or used at baptisms or for last rites.

== Cumdach (book-shrine) ==
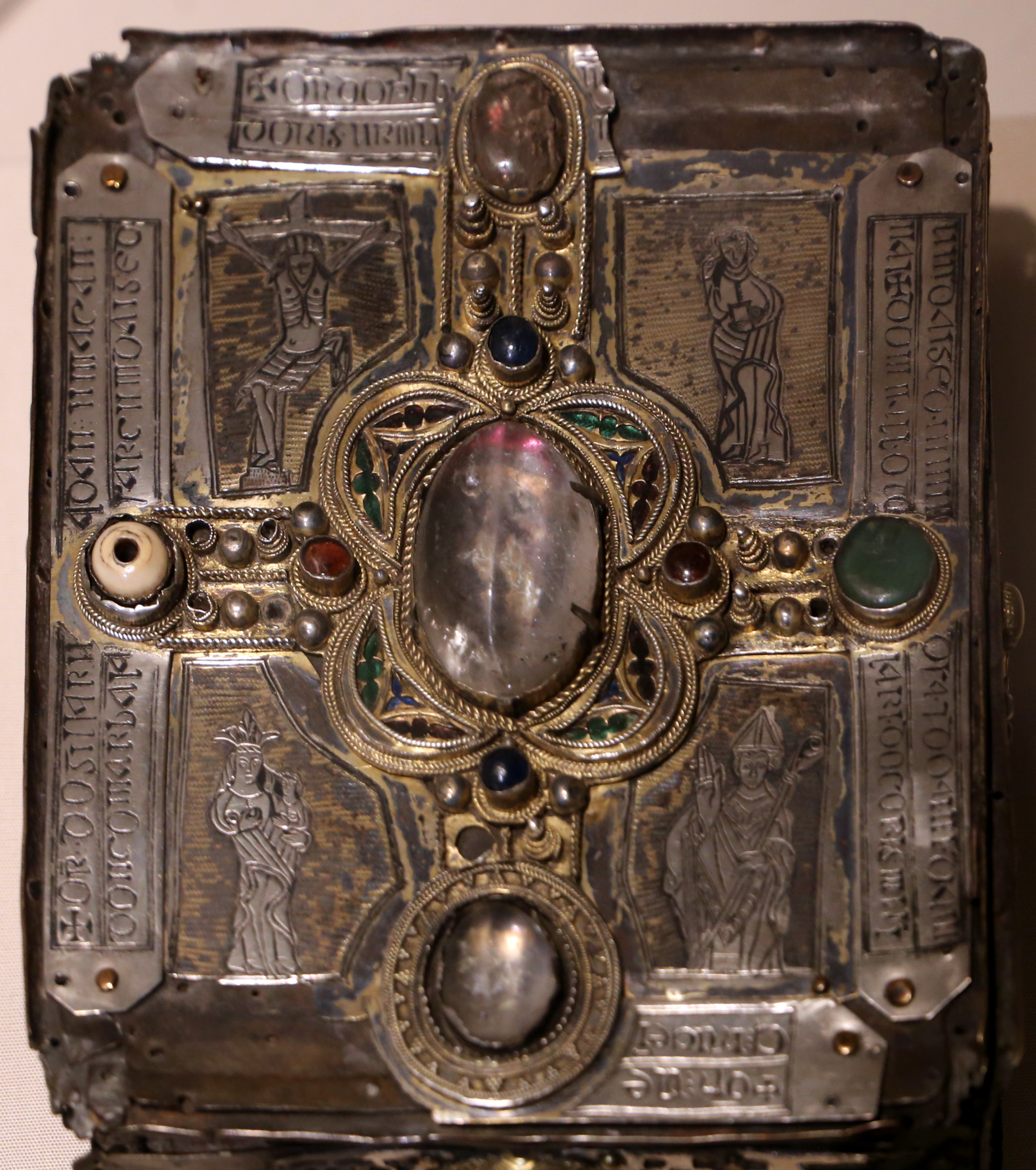
Front piece

The manuscript retains its cumdach or book-shrine, a distinctively Irish form of reliquary case for books associated with an important religious figure; this is one of only five early examples. It is a box with metalwork plaques attached with nails to a wooden core of oak. The metalwork is elaborately decorated, with some animal and human figures, and one face and the sides probably date to between 1026 and 1033, based on inscriptions recording its donation and making, while the other face is later, and can be dated to about 1375, again from its inscriptions. The eleventh-century dating makes it one of the oldest known cumdachs, after the Soiscél Molaisse of 1001–1011.

The older "lower" face, which is today detached from the case, is in silver-gilt copper alloy, with a large cross inside a border that carries the inscription in Irish, which also runs along the arms of the cross. The centre of the cross was later replaced ("severely embellished" as the National Museum put it), probably at the same time as the later face, by a setting for a large stone (now missing) with four lobed sections, similar to the centre of the later face.

The inscription has missing sections because of this, but can mostly be reconstructed: "It asks for a prayer for the abbot of Lorrha, Mathgamain Ua Cathail (+1037) and for Find Ua Dúngalaigh, king of Múscraige Tíre (+1033). It also mentions Donnchadh mac Briain, son of Brian Boru, styled 'king of Ireland', Mac Raith Ua Donnchada, king of the Eoganacht of Cashel (+1052) as well as the name of the maker, Donnchadh Ua Taccáin a monk 'of the community of Cluain (Clonmacnoise)'." The four spaces between cross and border have panels of geometric openwork decoration, and there are small panels with knotwork decoration at the corners of the border and inside the curved ends of the cross members.

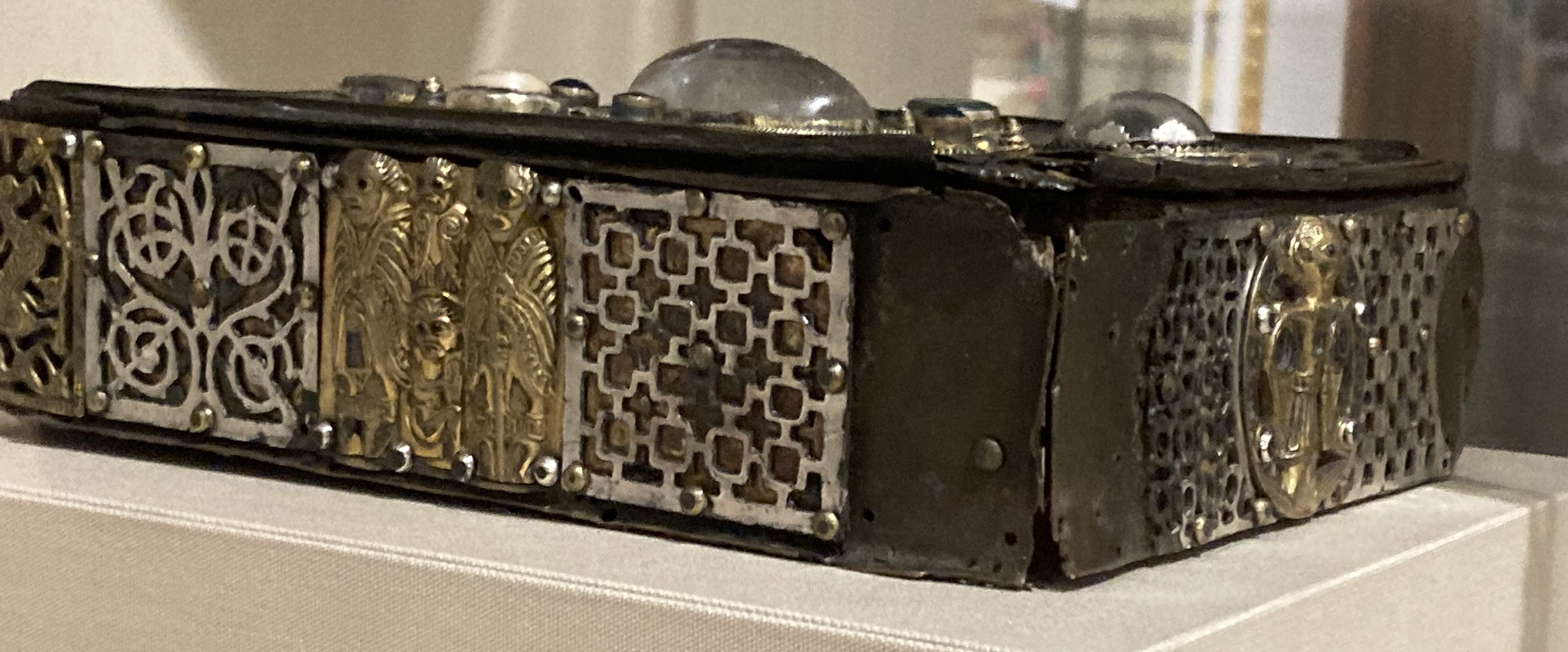
Side panel (left-hand long-side)

The sides have unsilvered copper alloy plaques with figures of angels, animals, clergy and warriors, set in decorative backgrounds. The newer "upper" face, of silver-gilt, is again centred on a cross with a large oval rock crystal stone at the centre and lobed surrounds, and other gems. The inscription, engraved on plain silver plaques, runs round the border and the spaces between the cross and border have four engraved figures of the crucified Christ, Virgin and Child, a bishop making a blessing gesture, and a cleric holding a book (possibly St John). The inscription "invokes a prayer for Pilib Ó Ceinnéidigh, 'king of Ormond' and his wife Áine, both of whom died in 1381. It also refers to Giolla Ruadhán Ó Macáin, abbot of the Augustinian priory of Lorrha and the maker, Domhnall Ó Tolairi".

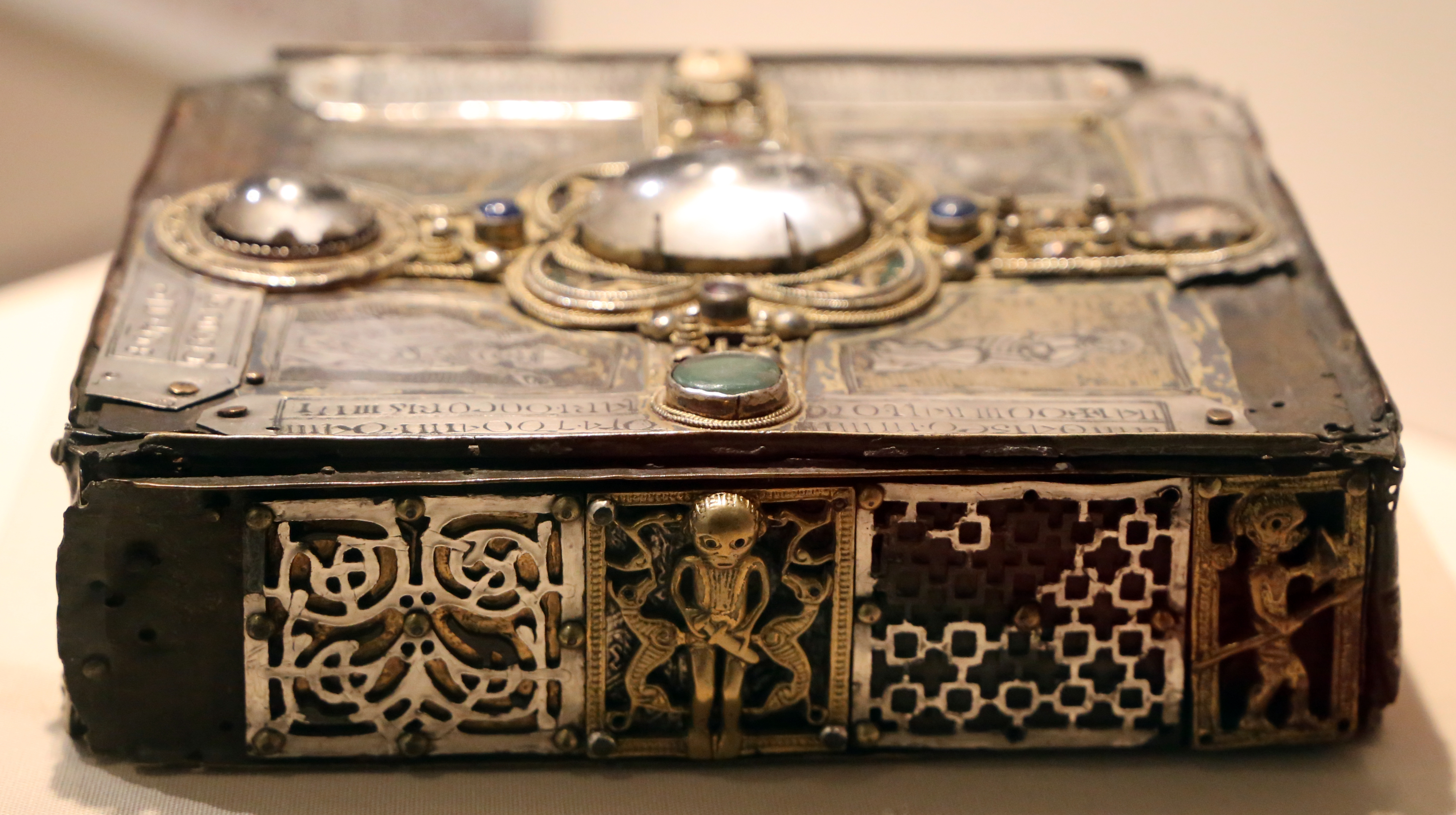
Side panel (lower short-side)

Black niello is used to bring out the engraved lines of the inscription and figures, and the technique is very similar to that of the later work on the Shrine of St Patrick's Tooth (also in the NMI), which was also given a makeover in the 1370s, for a patron some 50 km from Lorrha. They were probably added to by the same artist, something that can only rarely be seen in the few survivals of medieval goldsmith's work.
