= Cumdach =

Medieval Irish case for a reliquary or book

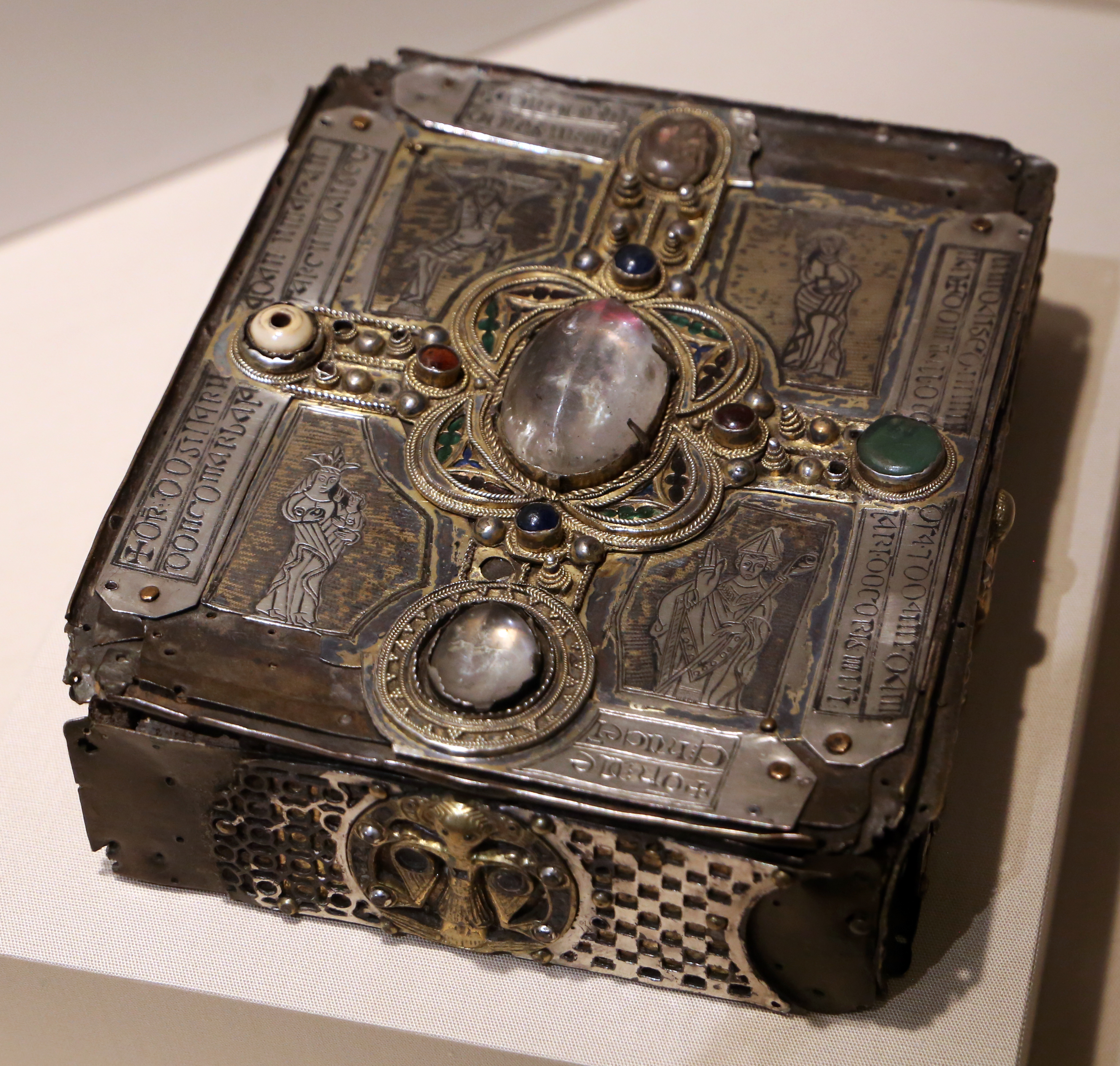
Cumdach for the Stowe Missal, 11th century

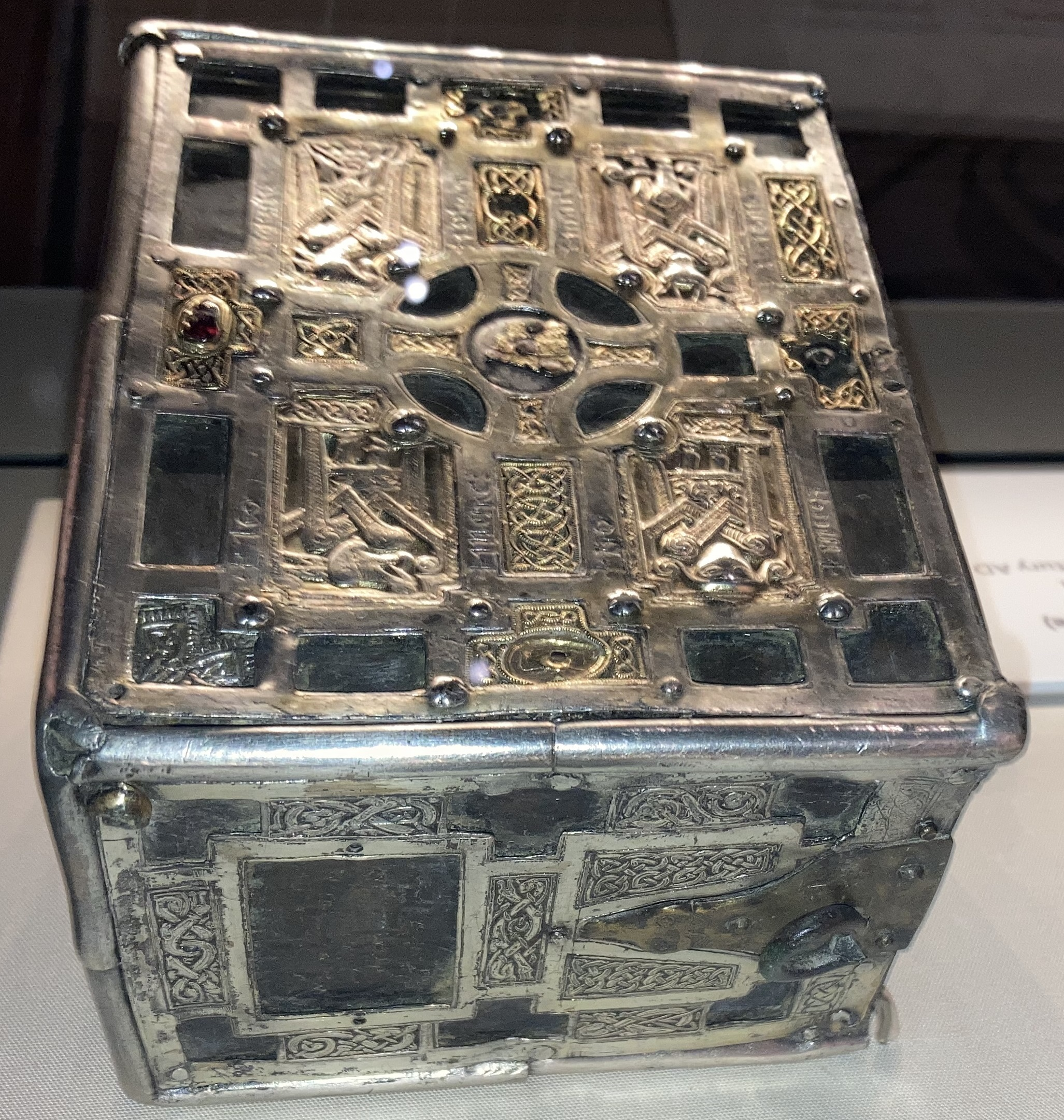
The Soiscél Molaisse, 11th century

A cumdach (Old Irish pronunciation: [ˈkuβ̃d̪ax], in Irish "cover") or book shrine is an elaborate ornamented metal reliquary box or case used to hold Early Medieval Irish manuscripts or relics. They are typically later than the book they contain, often by several centuries. In most surviving examples, the book comes from the peak age of Irish monasticism before 800, and the extant cumdachs date from after 1000, although it is clear the form dates from considerably earlier. The majority are of Irish origin, with most surviving examples held by the National Museum of Ireland (NMI).

The usual form is a design based on a cross on the main face, with the use of large gems of rock crystal or other semi-precious stones, leaving the spaces between the arms of the cross for more varied decoration. Several were carried on a metal chain or leather cord, often worn off the belt, or suspended around the neck, placing them next to the heart and thus offering spiritual and perhaps medical benefits (the same was done with the St Cuthbert Gospel in a leather bag in medieval Durham). They were also used to bring healing to the sick or dying, or more formally, as witness contracts. Many had hereditary laykeepers from among the chiefly families who had formed links with monasteries.

Only five early examples of cumdach survive, including those of the Book of Dimma and Book of Mulling at Trinity College Dublin, and the Cathach of St. Columba and Stowe Missal. Of the St. Molaise Shrine, only the Gospels are extant; the casing is lost, but more often the reverse is the case. Other books such as the Book of Kells, Book of Armagh and Book of Durrow are known to have once had either cumdachs or treasure bindings or both, but as they contained valuable precious metals they were a natural target for looters and thieves.

== Characteristics and formats ==
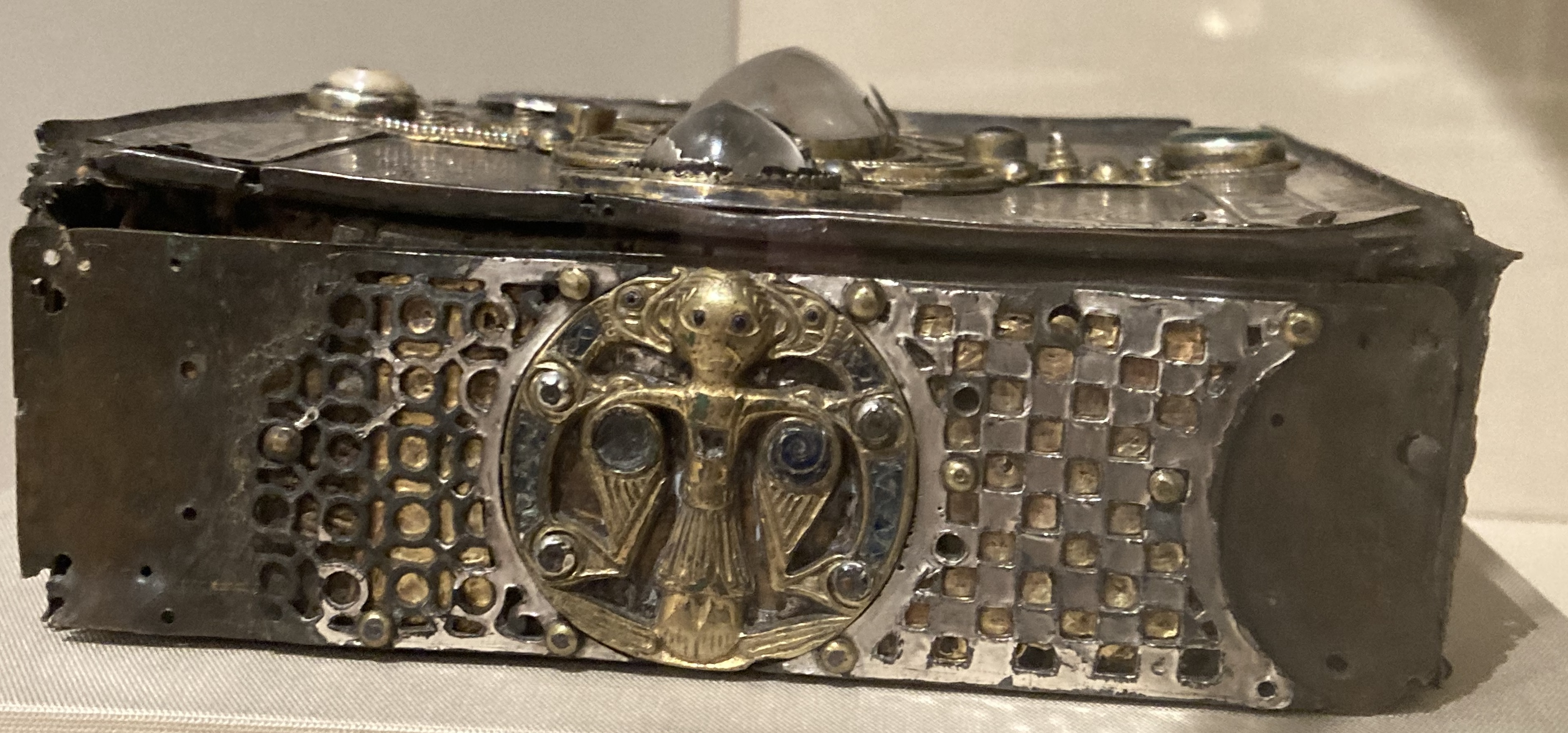
Side-view of the shrine of the Stowe Missal, mid-11th century

The format and function of cumdachs may derive from book caskets used by early Christian Romans. Both types were intended to protect sacred text or relics. It is plausible that Irish monasteries would seek to emulate the prestige and, according to the Irish art historian Rachel Moss, "splendour of Roman liturgical ceremonies". The Irish church emphasised relics that were thought to be objects frequently used by monastic saints, rather than the body parts preferred by most of the church. However, these were also kept in local versions of the house-shaped chasse form, such as the Scottish Monymusk Reliquary. Another Irish speciality was the bell-shrine, encasing the handbells used to summon the community to services or meals, and one of the earliest reliquaries enshrined the bell of an unknown saint, and was probably worn as a test of truthfulness and to cure illness. It probably dates to the 8th century and was found in a peat bog near Moylough, County Sligo.

As the sample size of 8 to 10 surviving examples is so small (presumably many such works were lost, mostly plundered for their precious metal or stones) they cannot be classified typologically. Their shared characteristics include that they are sealed, metal cases built to protect earlier objects of veneration originally placed in a timber core typically built from Yew wood or (less commonly) from oak. All of the later refurbishments seem to have been commissioned by ambitious clergy members, and the work carried out by single metal-workers and their workshops. In the majority of instances, the master metal worker left an inscribed signature and date of completion, some of which contain wording that hints at their artistic motivations.

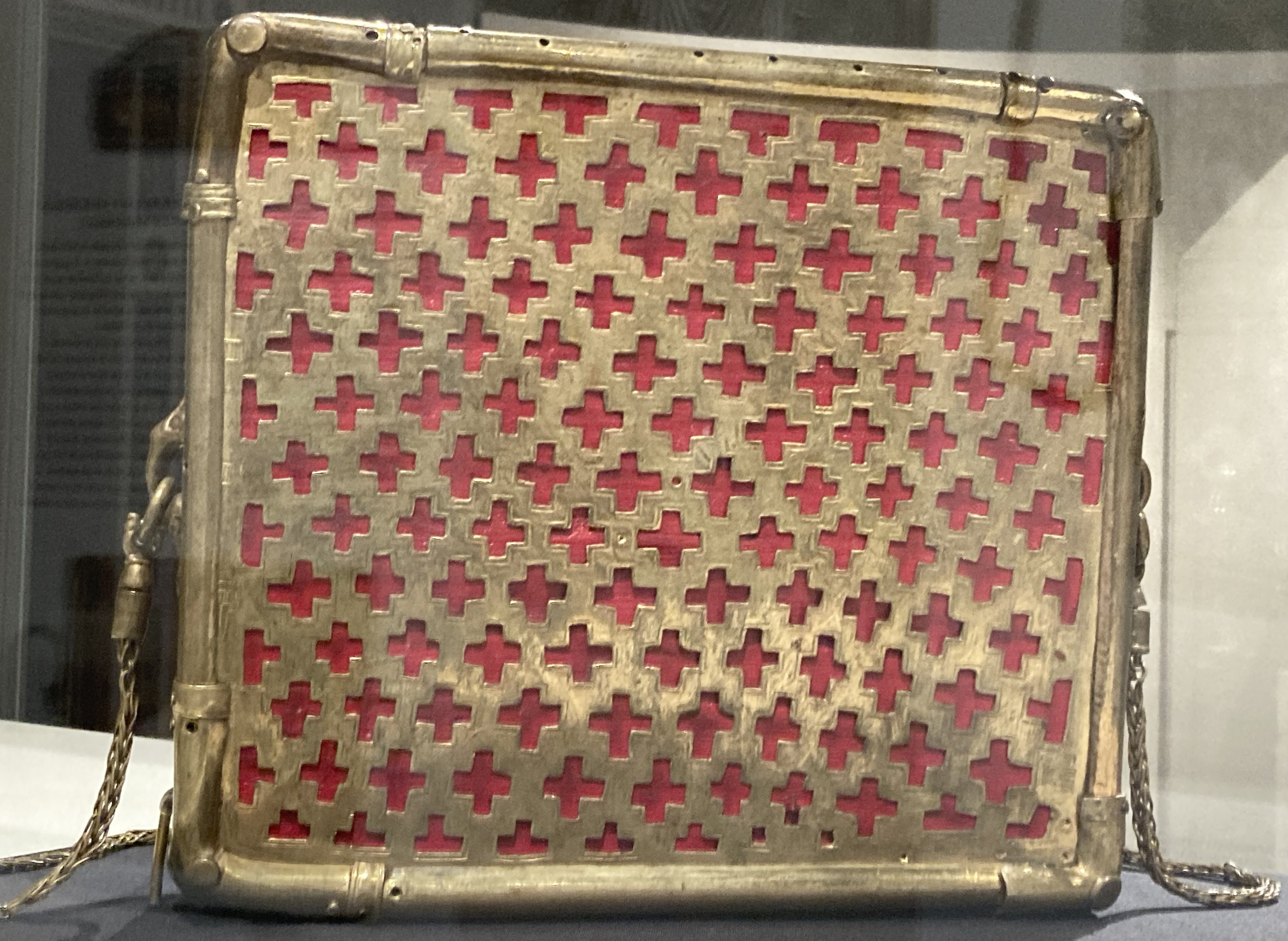
Reverse of the Shrine of the Cathach

All extant cumdachs' contain a frontispiece containing a central cross, a reverse with repetitive openwork patterns consisting of two highly contrasted colours (such as red and black), and sides containing interlace patterns and inscriptions. Distinguishing factors include size (indicating the originally intended function as for example as private fixed shrines pocketbooks, or objects to be worn over the shoulder or from belts), and their later use. The Shrine of Miosach retains its original chain used to carry it around, while the Soiscél Molaisse and Lough Kinsalen Shrine have fittings that once held leather straps, assumed to have held the objects in place during processional ceremonies.

They are to be distinguished from the metalwork treasure bindings that probably covered most grand liturgical books of the period—the theft and loss of that covering the Book of Kells (if it was not a cumdach alone) is recorded. However, the designs may well have been very similar; the best surviving Insular example, the lower cover of the Lindau Gospels (c. 880) in the Morgan Library in New York, is also centred on a large cross, surrounded by interlace panels. Treasure bindings were metalwork assemblies tacked onto the wooden boards of a conventional bookbinding, so essentially the same technically as the faces of many cumdachs, which are also attached with tacks to a core wooden box.

== Commission and production ==
Historians are generally confident in identifying who commissioned the shrines and their provenance. Exceptions include the Book of Durrow and the Stowe Missal. Inscriptions on two examples (Durrow and Stowe) indicate they were for a King of Ireland.

Almost nothing is known of the metal workers who produced them. A number contain inscriptions that can be read as signatures, but that is the extent of their historical record, as even first-rank craftsmen of the time were not mentioned in annuals and were not given obituaries when they died. As craftsmen were not given a high social status, it seems many were illiterate. Some of the signatures are unclear, with instances where the scribe was tasked with writing in Latin, but did not understand how to formulate the language.

== Function ==
Cumdachs basic utilitarian functions were as practical protective covers for their manuscript or relic, and to provide, sometimes portable, private centres of devotion, or were of liturgical use. The majority were intended to hold by then centuries older manuscripts, in instanced assumed to be written by major saints, such as Patrick, or legendary local monastery founders who had died 100s of years before the actual date of the manuscript. For this reason, many of the very early manuscripts owe their survival to their later, active status as relics. Most other early medieval Irish manuscripts were stored away in secure stone buildings, but were over the years sold, stolen or plundered, and thus lost.

The shrines were used during both ecclesiastical and secular ceremonies, such as granting insignia of office, swearing of oaths or signing treaties. The books of Dimma and Mulling were found with inserts containing texts from masses of the dead, indicating they were used for healing purposes. The book of Durrow was periodically removed from its (now lost) cumdach during the late medieval and early modern periods so that it could be used to bless and cure sick animals.

=== Battle standards ===
Reliquaries were often used as battle standards in medieval Ireland, with expectation that they would boost morale, protect the troops, or grant victory. Typically the relics would be held in, or represented by, crosiers, bell-shrines or cumdachs, and carried onto the battlefield by a cleric, who would often be employed by the family as its "hereditary custodian". The most well-known cumdach used for this purpose is the Cathach of St. Columba (known as The Cathach or Battler of St. Columba), used as a battle talisman by the O'Donnell family. According to art historian Colum Hourihane, "not only did the shrine and its iconography have to instil fear into the enemy, but, more importantly, it had to instill confidence into the army of the O’Donnells following it". The objects were usually worn around the neck, and the tradition was that the holder would circle the area three times in a "sunwise" direction before the battle commenced. Other cumdachs known to have been used in this way include the Shrine of Miosach and the Shrine of Caillín.

Clerics were allowed non-combatant status, reducing the likelihood that the reliquary would be captured. Younger clerics were usually selected, according to the historian Anthony Lucas, as a result of "prudent consideration that they stood a better chance than men of mature years of escaping with their precious burden by speed of foot should they find themselves in a tight corner in the melee." However, the holder was sometimes killed in battle; in 1497 The Cathach was captured after its keeper was slain by enemy forces. Similarly, the Book of Armagh is recorded as having been brought to battlefields, and was once recovered from underneath the dead body of its custodian.

== Surviving examples ==
Cumdachs are particular to Ireland. There are eight known surviving Irish examples (in chronological order: the Lough Kinale Book-Shrine, Soiscél Molaisse, Stowe Missal, The Cathach, Shrine of Miosach, Book of Dimma, Shrine of the Book of Moling, and Shrine of Caillín of Fenagh) with a further two—of the nine extant—"house-shaped shrines", namely the 12th century St Manchan's shrine and the c. 1350 additions to the Domnach Airgid. All are protective enclosures intended to permanently seal off a manuscript or relic, and date from between the early 9th to the mid-16 centuries.

Several of the earliest documented examples are now lost. The Book of Durrow had a metal casing dated to c. 1002–1015 and the Book of Kells lost its cumdach when it was stolen in 1006. The Book of Armagh was given a cover in 937, which was perhaps lost when it was captured in battle and ransomed by the Norman John de Courcy in 1177. The earliest documented example was made to house and protect the Book of Durrow at the behest of the High King of Ireland Flann Sinna (877–916). By that point, it was at Durrow, and believed to be a relic of Columba (Colum Cille). The shrine was lost in the 17th century. Still, its appearance, including an inscription recording the king's patronage, is recorded in a note from 1677, now bound into the book as folio IIv, although other inscriptions are not transcribed. Once in their shrines, such manuscripts were rarely, if ever, removed for use as a book.

=== Lough Kinale Book Shrine ===
The earliest-known cumdach is also the largest surviving example. Dated to the late 8th or early 9th century, it was not rediscovered until 1986 when found by divers at a depth of 2 m (6 ft 7 in) of water in the County Longford side of Lough Kinale. Moss speculates that it was thrown in the water to evade being taken during a local chieftain feud or before a Viking raid. The inner structure is of oak, lined with tin and bronze plates attached by nails. Its front cover contains a large central cross, five bosses in bronze, and four rounded openwork medallions containing spiral and lentoid patterns. The figures on the sides include beast heads. A 2016 valuation by the NMI priced the object at £2 million (€2.54 million).

=== Soiscél Molaisse ===
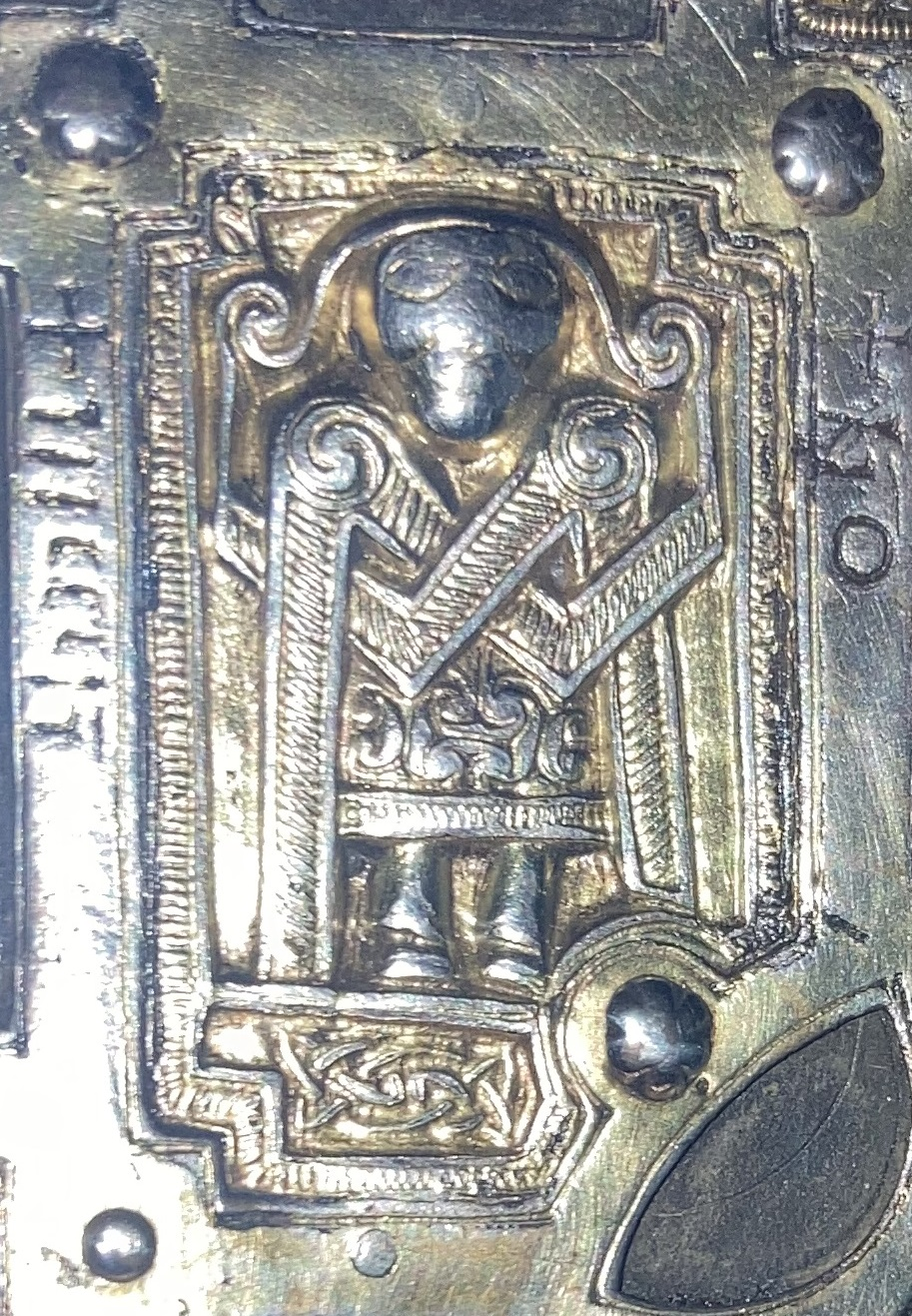
Detail a panel on the front showing Matthew the Apostle.

The Soiscél Molaisse, also known as the Sheskill Molash, is the second oldest surviving cumdach example largely in its original form, and was made in the early 11th century to hold the gospels of Molaise. It measures 14.75 cm (5.81 in) high, 11.70 cm (4.61 in) wide and 8.45 cm (3.33 in) thick and was built in three phases. The wooden core with a bronze casing dates back to the 8th century, to which silver plaques were fastened with nails and rivets in the 11th century. It was reworked again in the 14th or 15th century.

Some of the figures and other elements date to the 14th century, and can be identified as they were soldered to the plates. The top face is mainly silvered bronze and silver-gilt and contains panels the four symbols of the Evangelists in the spaces between a cross. Some of the panels are lost; those that remain have gold filigree interlaced knotwork. The filigree on the arms of the cross are gilted and decorated with ribbon interlace. The ends of the arms were set with gems, now also lost except for one blue stone. Two of panels around the sides are lost. The two remaining contain interlace and Latin inscription around their borders. Its small size indicates that the original object, like the Book of Dimma, was designed to be held in a pocket.

=== Stowe Missal ===
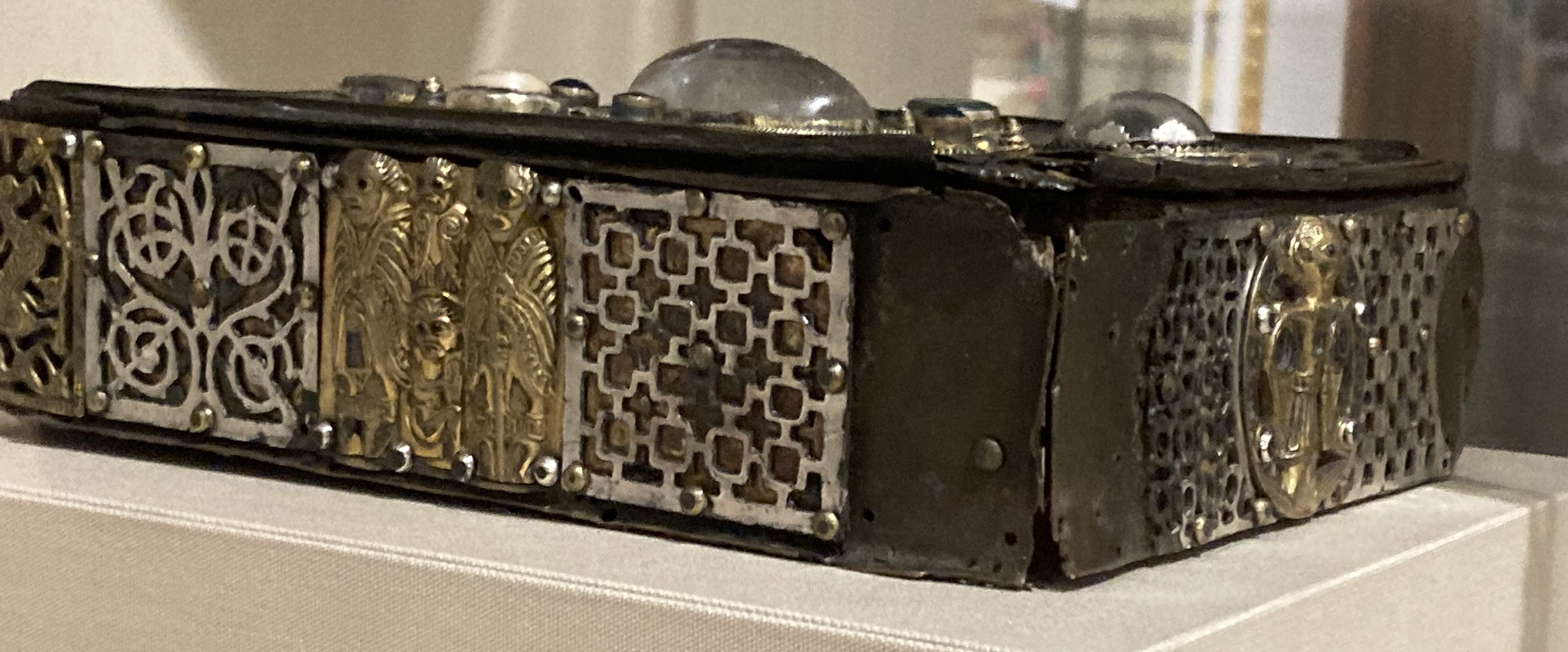
Sidel panel, Stowe Missal

The Stowe Missal is a sacramentary dating to about 750. Its cumdach consists of metalwork plaques attached with nails to an older oak container. The metalwork is elaborately decorated, featuring some animal and human figures, and the faces and sides probably date to between 1027 and 1033, based on inscriptions that record its donation and manufacture. The other face is later and can be dated to approximately 1375, also from its inscriptions.

The older "lower" face, which has become detached from the case, is in silver-gilt copper alloy, with a large cross inside a border that carries the inscription in Irish, which also runs along the arms of the cross. The centre of the cross was later replaced ("severely embellished" as the National Museum put it), probably at the same time as the later face, by a setting for a now missing large stone with four lobed sections, similar to the centre of the lower face. The inscription has missing sections because of this, but can mostly be reconstructed as asking for a prayer for the abbot of Lorrha, Mathgamain Ua Cathail (c. 1037) and for Find Ua Dúngalaigh, king of Múscraige Tíre (c. 1033).

=== Cathach of St. Columba ===
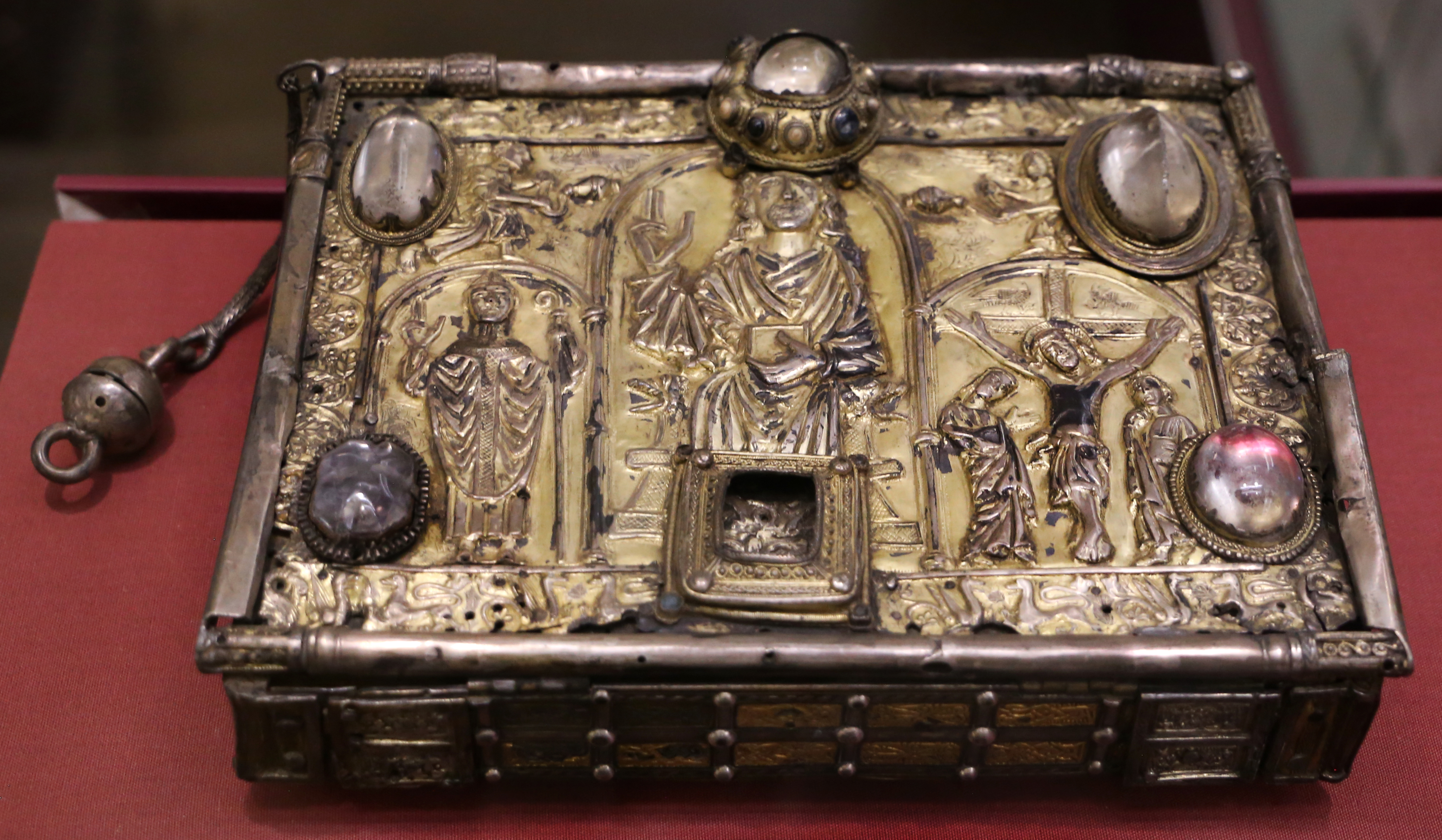
The Shrine of Cathach of St. Columba

The Cathach of St. Columba, also known as The Cathach, is probably the best-known cumdach. Built for the Cathach of St. Columba, an important psalter usually dated to just after the death of Colum Cille in 597, it is probably the earliest Irish book to survive and a very prestigious relic. The manuscript belonged to the O'Donnells while its shrine was famously used as a battle standard.

The initial metalwork dates from 1072 to 1098 at Kells, when a new protective casing of wood and silver was added. The front cover was added in the 14th century, and included a large seated Christ in Majesty flanked by scenes of the Crucifixion and saints in gilt repoussé. It was taken to the continent in 1691 following the Treaty of Limerick, and did not return to Ireland until 1813. That year, the cumdach was reopened, leading to the rediscovery of the manuscript. It was by then in very poor condition, but underwent a major restoration in 1982 when the extant pages were rebound and remounted on vellum leaves.

=== Shrine of Miosach ===
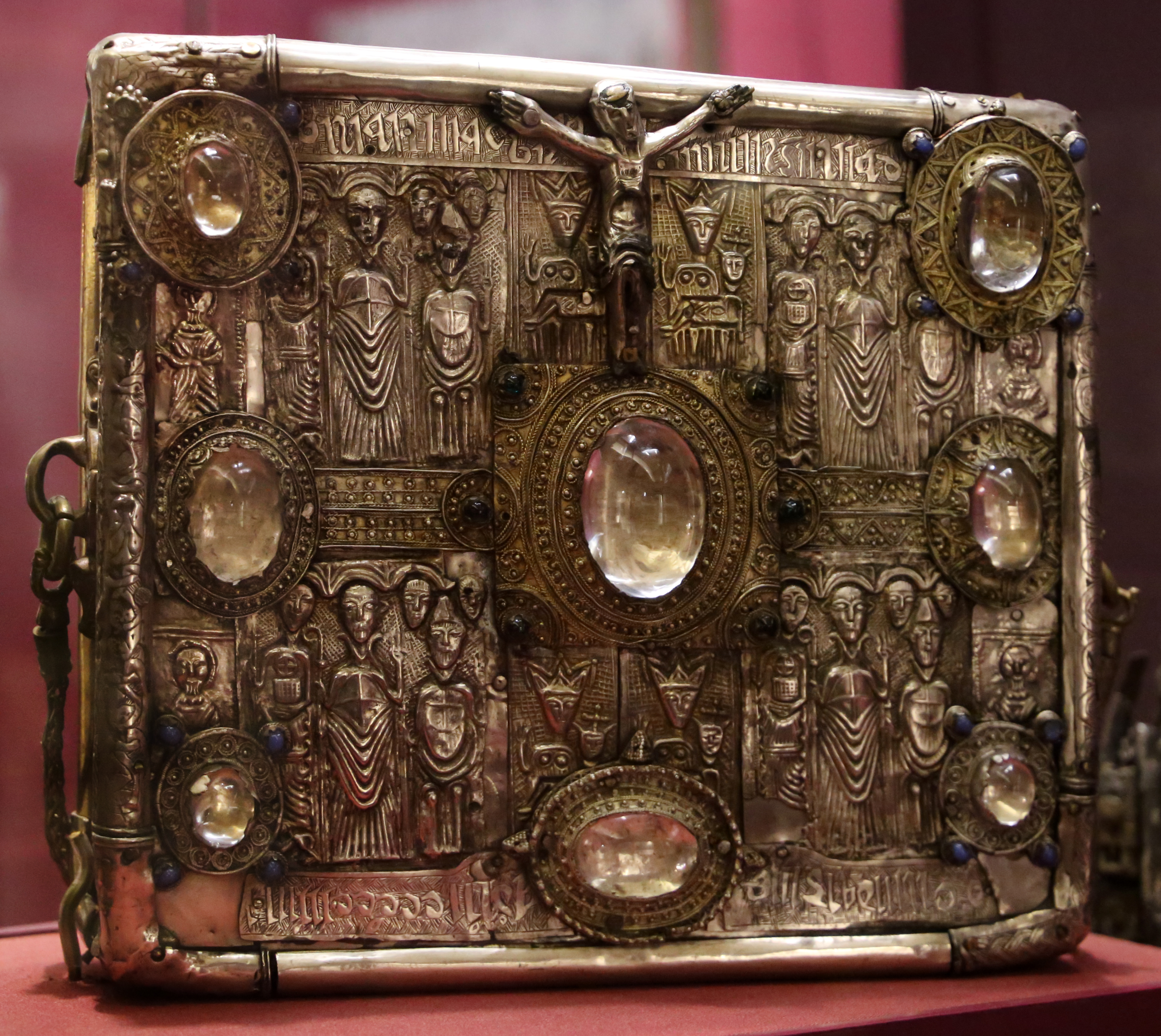
Panel for the front of the Shrine of Miosach, late 11th century, added to c. 1534

The Shrine of Miosach (or The Misach) originates from Clonmany, County Donegal, and was also used in battle. Originally a late 11th-century relic, it was reworked in 1534 by the goldsmith Brian O'Morrison with repoussé silver decoration with many figures around a cross. O'Morrison added twelve front plates in three arrangements, including depictions of the crowned Virgin and Child in the smaller inner panels, and, in four larger panels, Saint Bridget, St. Patrick and Colm Cille.

There is no record of what the original container might have held. The object was at first associated with St Cairneach of Dulane, County Meath, but by the Gothic period had been "absorbed into the cult of St Columba". The 11th-century cast copper alloy plates on the sides are decorated with openwork zoomorphic illustrations. Its metal cord survives for carrying it, and it was probably worn around the neck.

=== Domnach Airgid ===
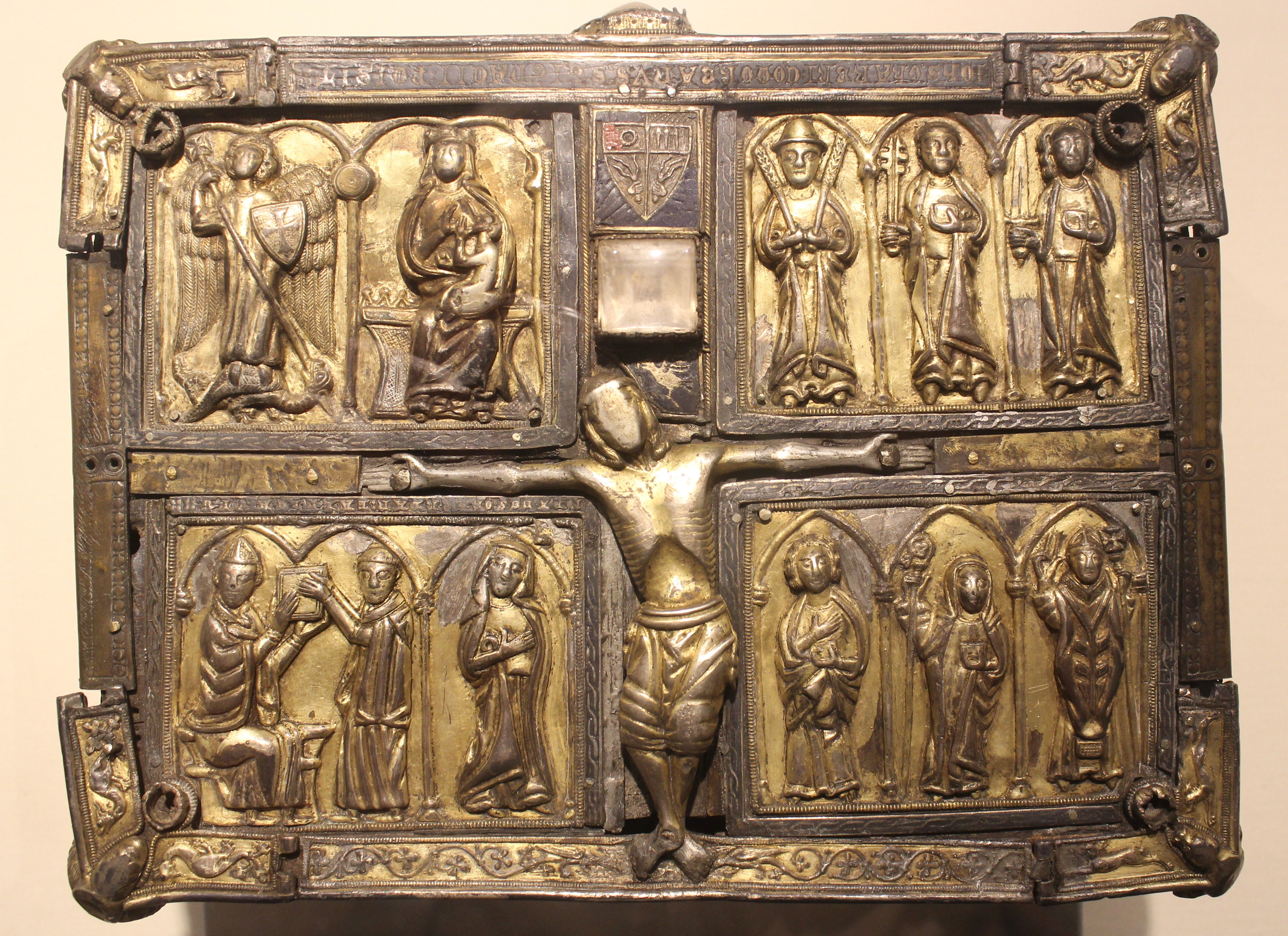
Front of the Domnach Airgid, late 8–9th and 14–15th centuries

The Domnach Airgid, whose title translates in English as the Silver church, dates to the 8th century, but little is visible from before major additions dated to c. 1350 under commission by the abbot of Clones. A three-dimensional figure of Christ crucified is at the centre of the main face, accompanied by relief plaques of saints, the Virgin and Child and other scenes on the sides.

The reliefs are more sophisticated compared to the other known 14th-century cumdachs, with elegant running animals on small mounts at the corners. It is signed by its goldsmith John O Bardan, who is recorded living at Drogheda; by then goldsmiths in Ireland, as elsewhere in Europe, were usually laymen.

=== Book of Dimma ===
The Book of Dimma cumdach dates to the 12th century and was built for the small 8th-century manuscript known as the Book of Dimma. The manuscript is traditionally associated with the abbey's founder St Crónán (died 619). Its small size indicated it was intended as a portable pocket book used for study or contemplation. It is made up of copies of four Gospels and contains stylised portraits of the Apostles St. Matthew, St. Mark and St. Luke.

The shrine consists of a shell of decorated bronze plates, and like its illuminated manuscript originates from the abbey of Roscrea. The first phase of the cumdach was completed during a period of prosperity for the abbey and broadly coincides with the building of a Romanesque church on the site. It was refurbished c. 1400 by one of the chieftains of the local Ua Cerbaill family. One face of the cumdach's panels of openwork decoration in Viking Ringerike style. Like the manuscript, it is in Trinity College Library, Dublin, while an early 20th-century reproduction is in New York.

=== Shrine of Caillín of Fenagh ===
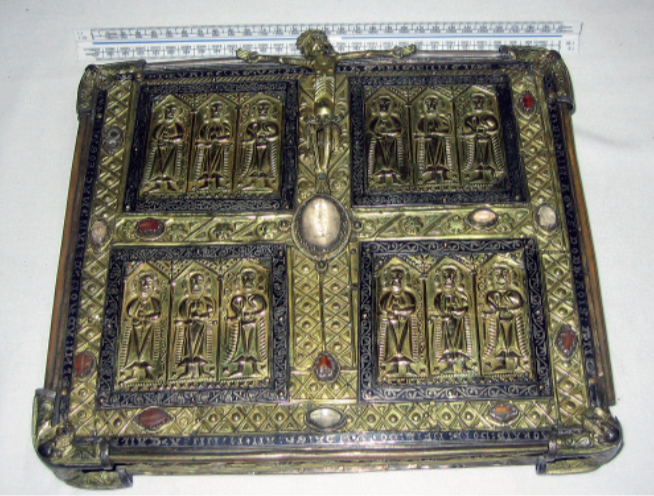
The Shrine of St. Caillín, NMI

The Shrine of Caillín of Fenagh is a late example built to hold a c. 1516 manuscript which updates a much earlier book detailing the life of St. Caillín of Fenagh, County Leitrim (fl. c. 570), which may have been written by the saint himself. Caillín is described by Lucas as "something of a specialist in the production of battle talismans" and according to legend, in his lifetime commissioned several battle standards, including cathachs in the form a bell and a containers for a Gospel. It was badly damaged in a devastating 2009 fire at St Mel's Cathedral, Longford, where it had been kept since 1980. The remains of the shrine was acquired by the NMI the following year; the manuscript is now in the collection of the Royal Irish Academy. There is some doubt as to if the shrine was actually intended as a cumdach, including the fact that it is smaller than the manuscript.

== Study and conservation ==
Although most of the extant book-shaped protective shrines are mentioned in Irish annals, they were not properly described until the early 19th century when antiquarians and collectors such as George Petrie began to seek them out from hereditary collections. Most are badly damaged, including due to general wear and tear over the centuries, events such as fires at their holding location, or most usually having elements such as their gemstones removed for sale by their owners. A majority are now in the NMI.

The most significant lost cumdachs mentioned in Irish annals, which are also the three earliest, are the shrines for the Book of Armagh (added 938 AD), Book of Durrow (c. 877—91) and the shrine for the Book of Kells (which may have only been an ornamental metal container, rather than a permanently sealed and illustrated cover), which is recorded as plundered in the 1007 annals of Ulster.
