= Domnach Airgid =

8th century Irish book shrine

Domhnach Airgid
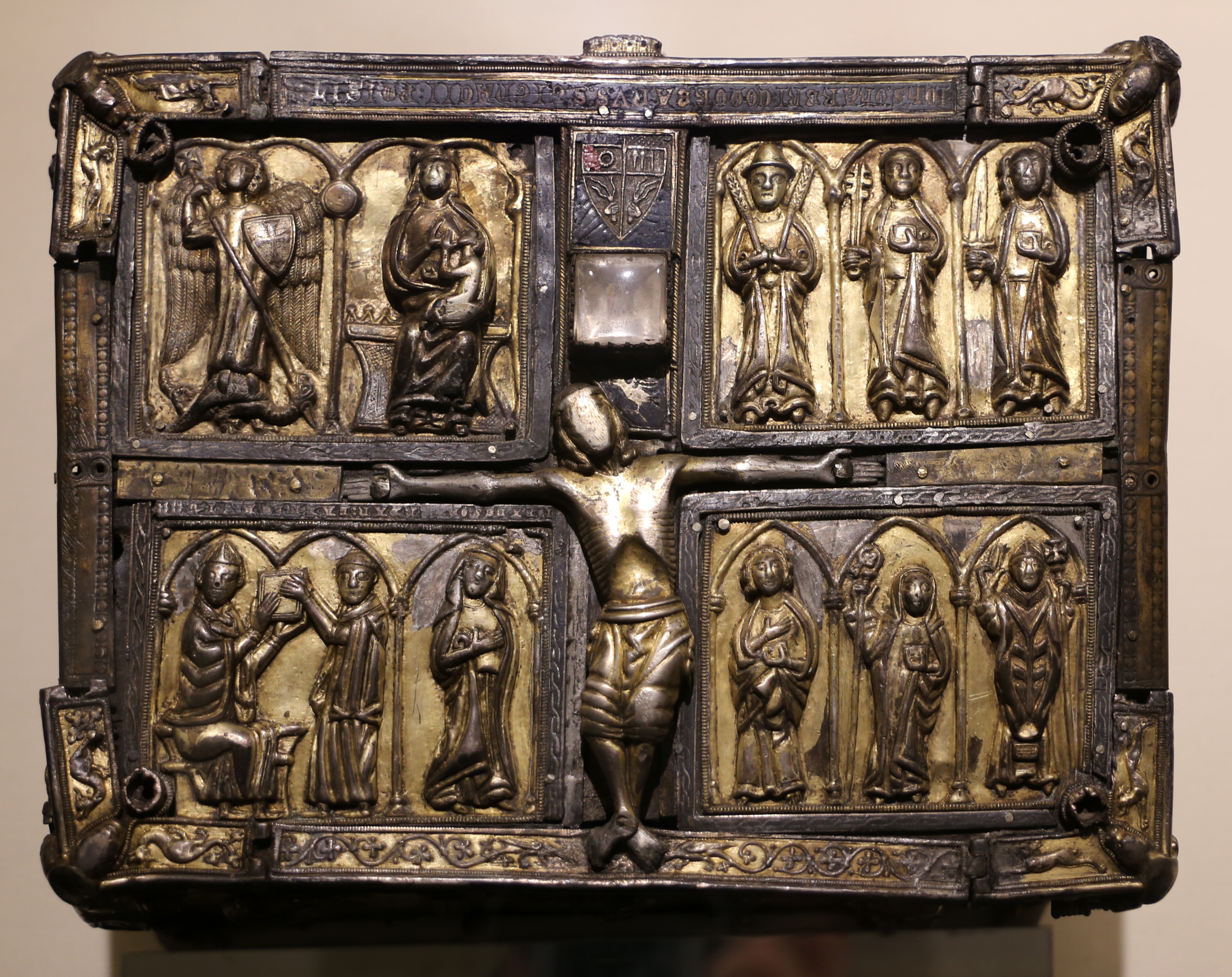
- 14th century front cover
- Material: Yew-wood, copper, silver
- Size: height 23cm, width 16.7cm, depth 9.8cm.
- Created: 8th or 9th century, added to in the mid-14th century, 15th century, and after
- Discovered: County Fermanagh, Ireland
- Present location: National Museum of Ireland, Dublin

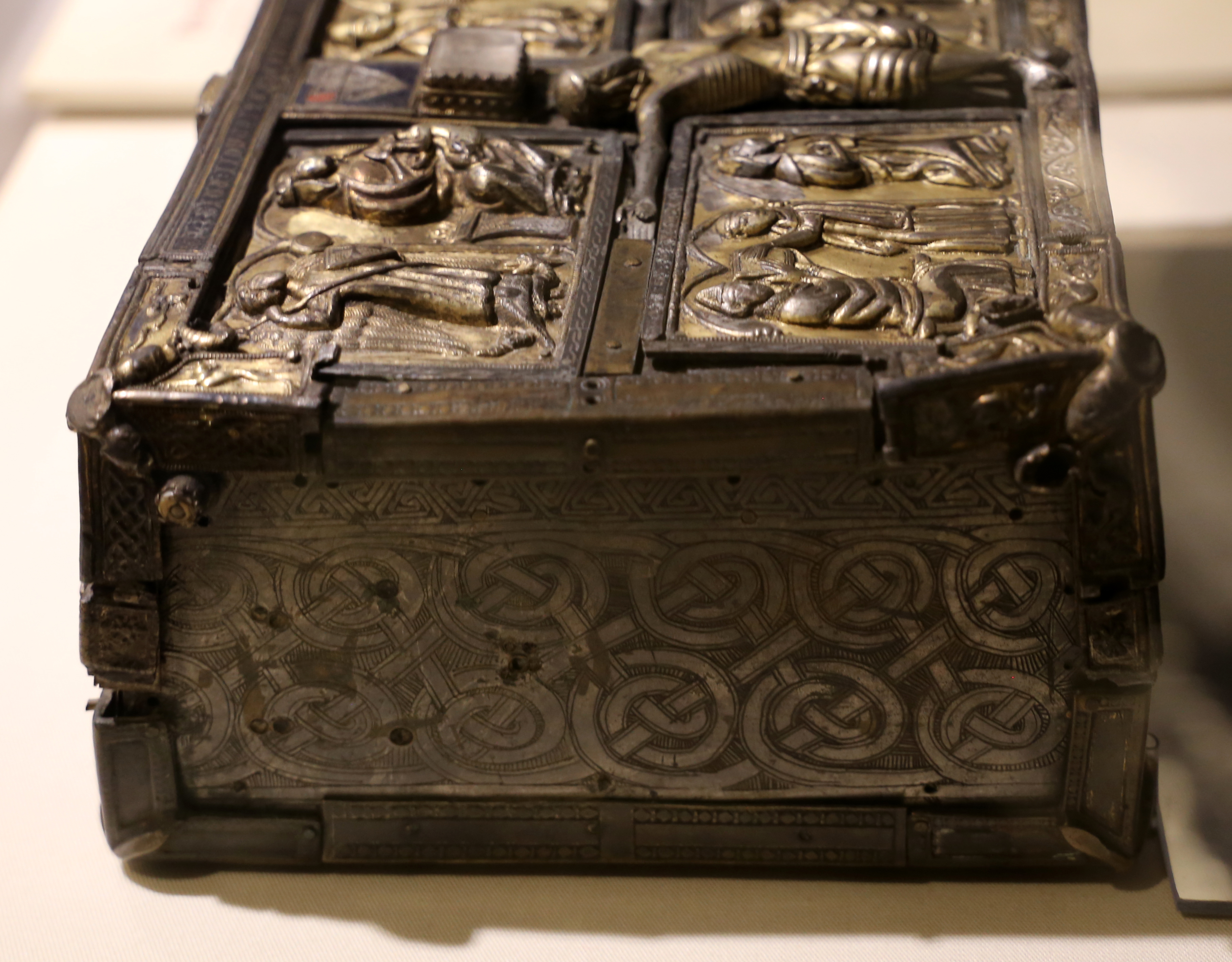
Side panels on the short right-hand side

The Domnach Airgid (Modern Irish: Domhnach Airgid, [ˈd̪ˠõːnˠəx ˈaɾʲəɟədʲ]; English: Silver Church or Shrine of Saint Patrick's Gospels) is an 8th-century Irish wooden reliquary. It was considerably reworked between the 13th and 15th centuries and became a cumdach or "book shrine", when its basic timber structure was reinforced and decorated by elaborate silver-gilt metalwork. Its front cover was enhanced by gilded relief showing Jesus in "Arma Christi" (with Instruments of the Passion), alongside depictions of saints, angels, and clerics, in scenes imbued with complex iconography. It is thus considered a mixture of the early Insular and later International Gothic styles.

When opened in the 19th century, the shrine was found to hold badly decayed leaves from a 6th-9th century manuscript recounting the Gospels written in Vulgate Latin. Thirty-nine pages of the manuscript survive, each measuring about nine inches in height. Based on the inscriptions, it is thought to be one of the earliest surviving depictions of apostles portrayed with their attributes and Instruments of the Passion. It has been in the National Museum of Ireland in Dublin since 1847. There is an early 20th-century replica in the Metropolitan Museum of Art in New York.

The earliest records title the shrine as the "Domnach" (pronounced Donagh), a word derived from the Latin "Dominicus" (Belonging to God or of the Master). The Irish antiquarian George Petrie (1790–1866) was one of the first to describe the Domnach Airgid. He assumed that the box was created to host relics and only later became a decorative shrine and container for Gospel manuscripts.

== Description ==
The Domnach Airgid is oblong shaped and is 23cm high, 16.7cm wide, and 9.8cm long. It contains three covers, each built during separate phases. The inner-most is made of Yew-wood and dates to the early medieval period when the object was built to hold relics and portions of a Gospel. The middle cover dates from the 14th century and is made of tinned copper-alloy plates lined with silver, while the 15th-century outer cover is formed from silver plated with gold.

=== Early medieval casket ===
And the Saint then left Bishop Mac Carthainn there, at Clogher,
and bestowed the Domhnach Airgid upon him,
which had been given to Patrick from heaven,
when he was on the sea, coming to Erin.

— Matthew Arnold, "Celtic Literature", 1891

The original early medieval casket was built to hold relics, and is dated to either the late eighth or early ninth century. It consisted of a single yew-wood chamber with a sliding door, and was covered with tinned bronze plates decorated with interlace. The original plates on the sides of the shrine are still visible.

It is traditionally associated with Patrick and believed to have been in his possession and sanctified by him before he presented or gave it to St Macartan (454—506), the first Bishop of Clogher diocese in southwest Ulster. This story is first mentioned in a 7th-century vita of St. Patrick, in which the shrine is named as the Domnach Airgid. The original casket may have been referred to in the 10th century "Tripartite Life of St Patrick", which mentions gifts made to him, including relics of the Apostles, portions of the True Cross, and tufts of Mary's hair, or the Holy Sepulchre. Historians believe that such relics would have been collected during trips by Irish clergy to Rome.

=== 14 and 15th century plates ===
The shrine was significantly remodelled around 1350 under the commission of John O’Carbri, abbot of Clones, County Monaghan. The work was completed by the Clones craftsman and goldsmith John (Eoin) Ó'Bárdáin, whose signature (IOHANES: O BARRDAN: FABRICAVIT) is engraved on the shrine. Ó'Bárdáin is known to have lived in Drogheda, and modernised its appearance in the contemporary International Gothic style, including the covering of the earlier wood shrine with tin-lined bronze panels decorated with interlace knots. O’Carbri likely had political motivations for commissioning the redesign in the context of the Anglo-Norman invasion of Ireland. The Normans sought to undermine the established order, partly via an attack on Irish Christianity to detach the island from its Celtic heritage. In response, some clerics fought back by refurbishing and restoring early medieval sacred objects to reinforce the island's cultural identity.

During the first phase of reworking, the front plate (front cover) was replaced with four rectangular, silver gilt panels. A full-length, high-relief (alto-relievo) representation of the crucified Jesus positioned between these panels forms its center point. The Holy Spirit, shown in the form of a dove enamelled in gold, hovers above his head. A small, square reliquary decorated with crystal is positioned above the dove and is presumed to have once held what its owners believed was a fragment of the True Cross. The four panels around Jesus contain eleven smaller, ornately and delicately figures carved in low-relief (basso-rilievo), They depict saints and clerics dressed in clothes that draw from both early medieval Irish and European gothic styles.

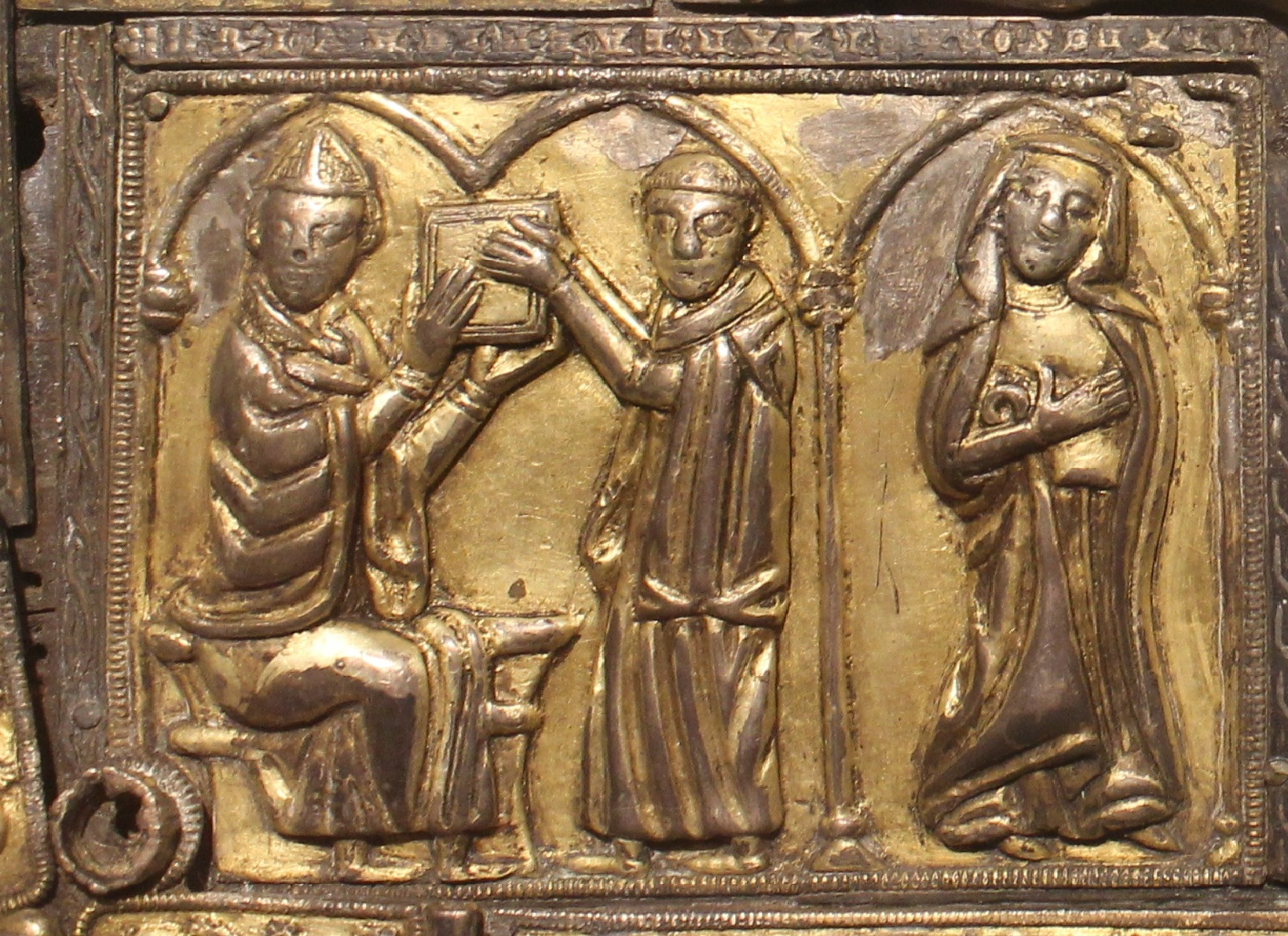
The Domnach Airgid presented by St Patrick to St Macartan in a mise en abyme type later known as the Droste effect

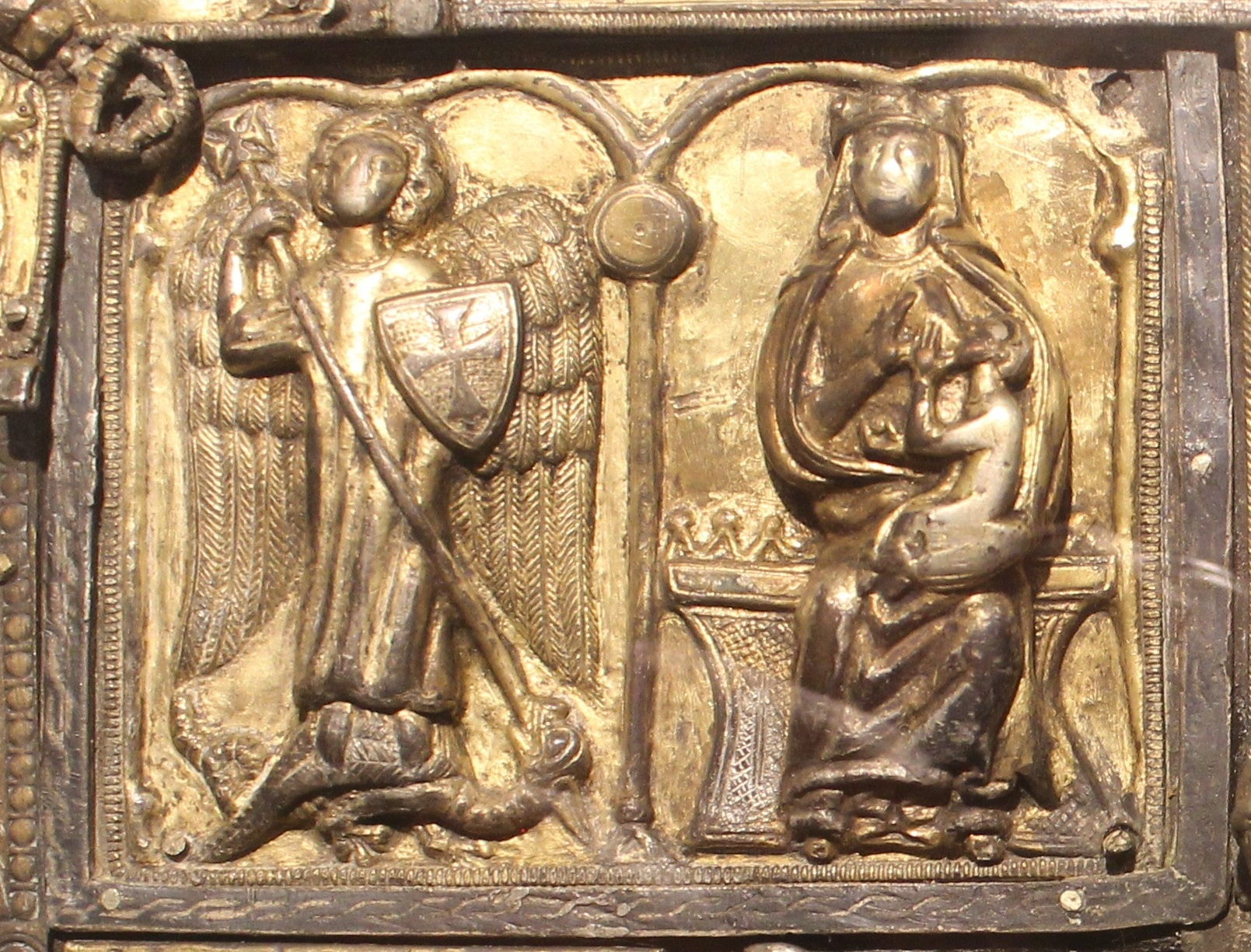
Upper left-hand panel of the front cover, showing the Archangel Michael and Mary

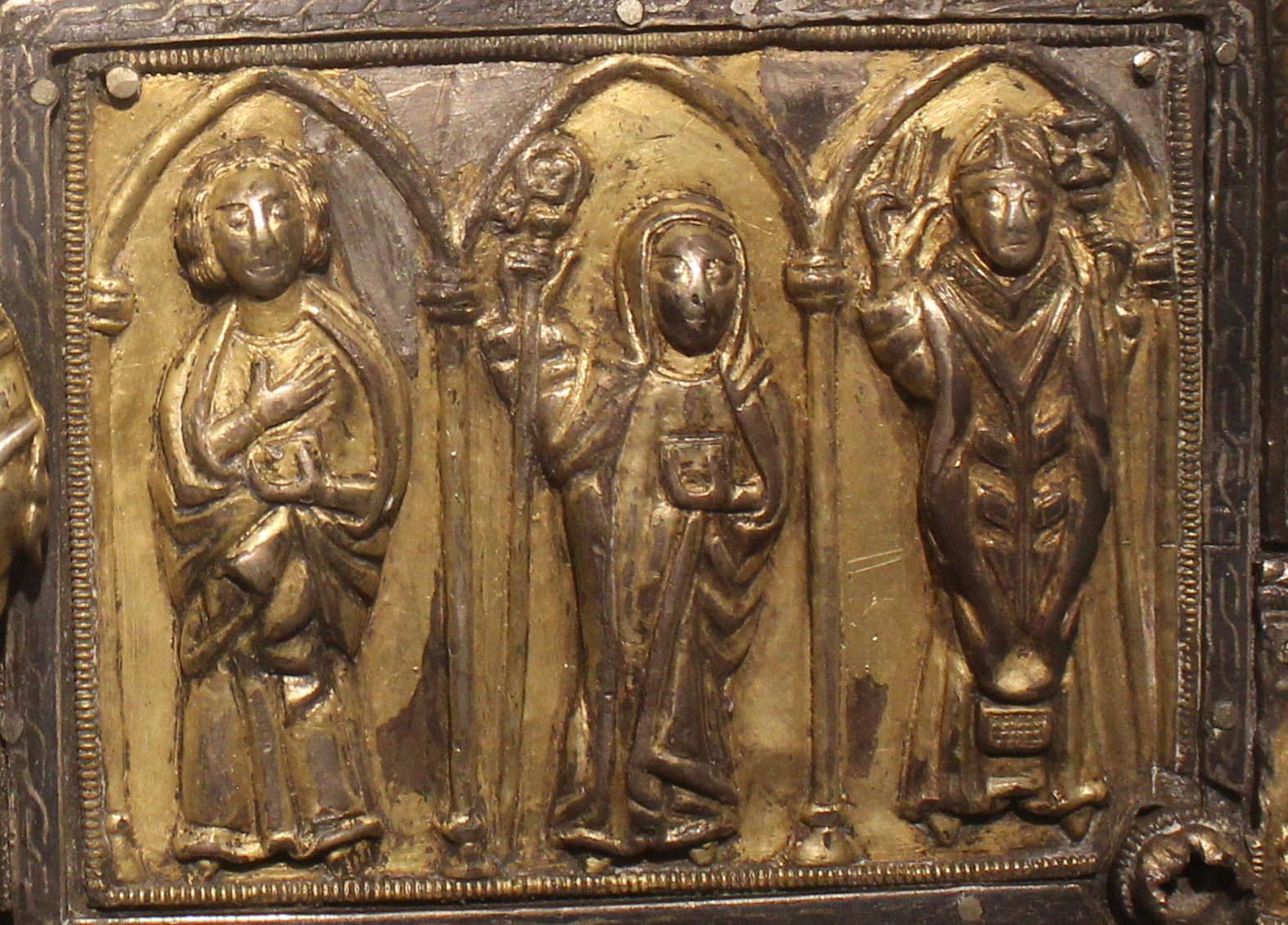
Lower right-hand panel, with an abbess and two clerics or saints, possibly the three Irish patron saints, Columba, St Brigid and St Patrick.

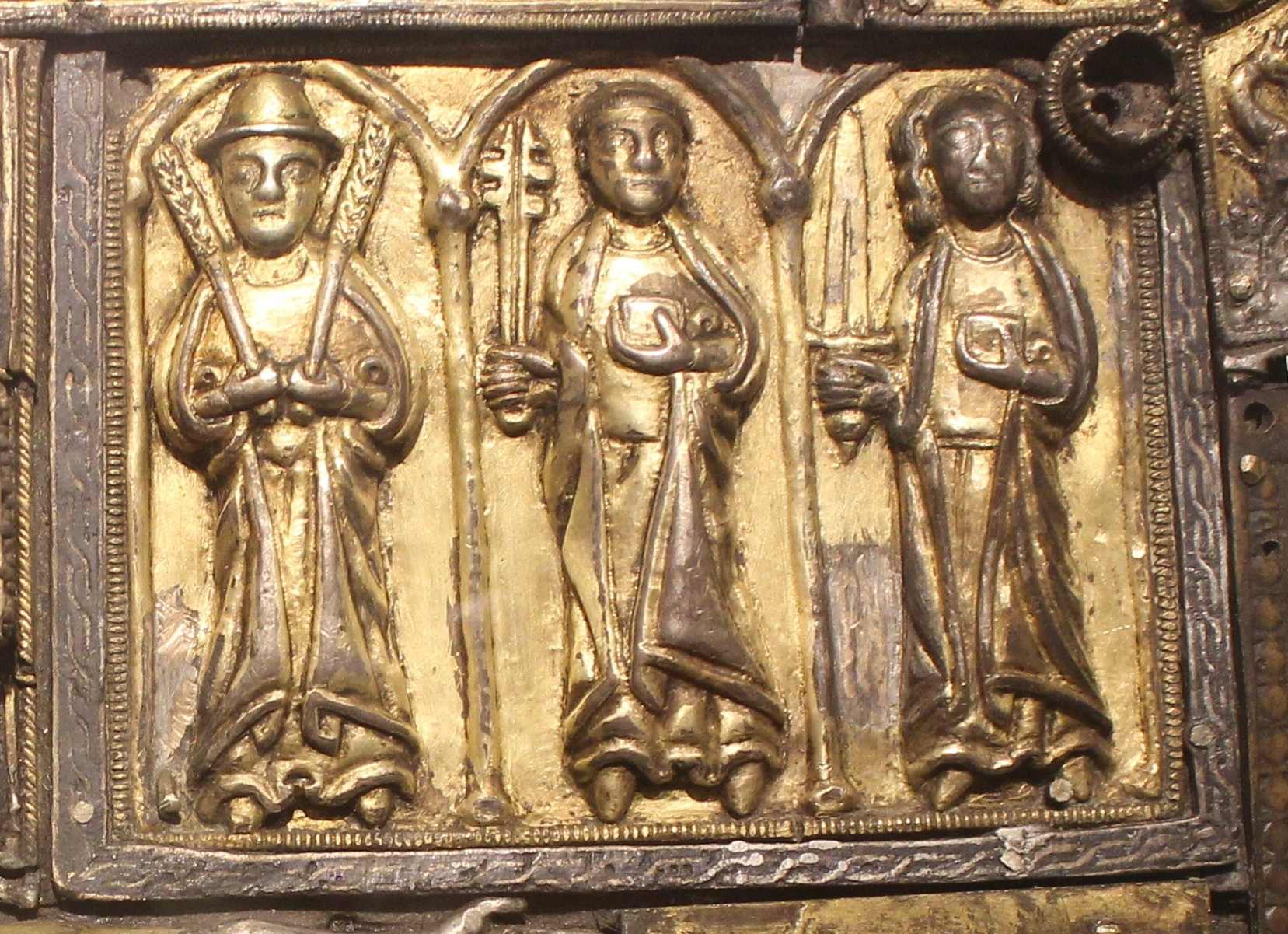
Upper right hand panel; unidentified figure (possibly St James), St Peter, Panel showing St Paul and two others

The upper left-hand panel shows the Archangel Michael and the Virgin and Child depicted in the Nursing Madonna (Virgo Lactans) style. In the panel to their right, an unidentified figure wears a broad-brimmed hat and holds what may be palms. He stands alongside saints Paul and Peter. The scribe in the lower right panel, who may represent St Patrick, presents a cumdach, seemingly the Domnach Airgid itself, to St Macartan. Above Jesus's head is a squared shaped hollow space intended as a holding space, which historians such as Rachel Moss view as possibly intended to hold a "passion relic" of the True Cross. Above that again is an enameled heraldic shield, decorated with a rock crystal, a precious stone that was rarity in Ireland at the time.

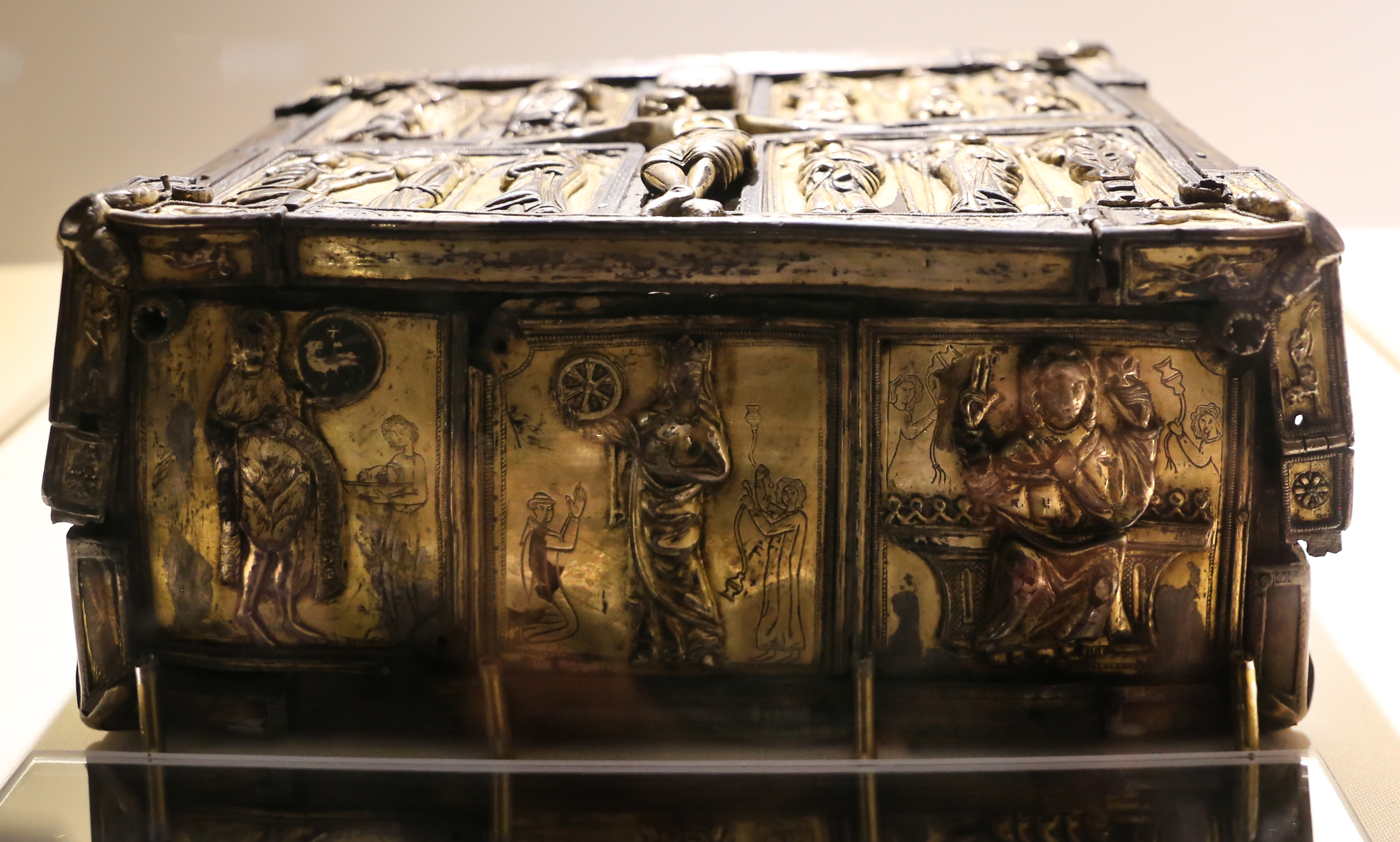
Panels on the shrine's lower short-side

The lower short side contains three plates also adorned with figures of saints. A cross added in 15th century to the rear panel depicts the three Magi. Other additions by craftsmen during this refurbishment include three circular mounds on the top plate, each of which were set with quartz crystals, though one is now lost. A number of other figures, including running animals and zoomorphic grotesques, some with large jaws and bulbous eyes, are placed on small mounts at the borders and corners of the front cover. The dove hovering above Christ's head was also added during this rework.

=== Manuscript ===
The folios of an eighth or ninth-century illuminated manuscript were found within the shrine when it was opened in 1832 by the antiquarian William Betham. The manuscript reproduced a Gospel written in Vulgate Latin, and inscribed with Irish majuscule script. The book is severely damaged, with just 39 extant leaves intact, of which some have become detached from their casing. It is today catalogued as MS. 24. Q. 23.

== Provenance ==
The Domnach Airgid was kept over the centuries in various religious houses and by local families in the Clogher and Clones region. It is thought to have been owned by "The Lord of Enniskillen", who was likely a member of the Maguire family executed following the Irish Rebellion of 1641. It is first mentioned in modern literature by John Groves in 1819 when it was kept as a private heirloom in Brookeborough, County Fermanagh. In 1832 it was purchased by the Dublin bookseller George Smith, after which it was acquired by the Anglo-Irish peer, Henry Westenra.

Petrie described the shrine's detail c. 1835-39, and in 1896 John Bernard published a detailed paper on the manuscript. In 1918, Edmund Armstrong and H. J. Lawlor provided in-depth descriptions and accounts of its symbolism and provenance for the Clogher Diocesan Register, and their work is still considered largely definitive. It was acquired by the Royal Irish Academy from Petrie in 1847, shortly after his death. This took place during a period of refocus and acquisition by the Academy (as they put it, "judicious purchasing"), in part influenced by the antiquities dealer Redmond Anthony's (1768-1848) collection of Irish medieval jewelry and decorative artworks. The museum's new directive sought to bring from private to public collections works of national historical significance such the Cross of Cong (a donation from 1839) and the Ardagh Hoard (acquired 1874), that had languished as mere curiosity pieces. The shrine was transferred to the National Museum of Ireland, Kildare Street, Dublin, on its founding in 1890.

== Condition ==
Due to its age, the Domnach Airgid is in poor condition. Areas of the gilding contain accumulations of dirt, and any colourisation has long since faded, leading to its current dark appearance of mostly brown and black hues. The metal works between the front cover plates are disjointed, while the back end is mostly lost, with just the bronze sheet, which may be early, remaining extant. Petrie said that the order of some of the figures was changed during a repair of the front cover. However, he had an earlier drawing of the shrine, on which he based some of his descriptions.

== Sources ==
- Armstrong, Edmund; Lawlor, H. J. “The Domnach Airgid." Proceedings of the Royal Irish Academy. Section C: Archaeology, Celtic Studies, History, Linguistics, Literature, volume 34, 1917. pp. 96–126. JSTOR 25504212
- Arnold, Matthew. The Study of Celtic Literature Archived 4 October 2017 at the Wayback Machine. London: Smith, Elder, & Co, 1891
- Bernard, John. "On the Domnach Airgid MS." The Transactions of the Royal Irish Academy, volume 30, 1892–6. pp. 303–312. JSTOR 30079782
- Bourke, Cormac. "The Domnach Airgid in 2006". Clogher Record, volume 19, nr 1, 2006. pp. 31–42. JSTOR 27699541
- Cahill, Mary. "Mr. Anthony's Bog Oak Case of Gold Antiquities". Proceedings of the Royal Irish Academy: Archaeology, Culture, History, Literature, volume 94C, no. 3, 1994. JSTOR 25516126
- Diringer, David. The Book Before Printing: Ancient, Medieval and Oriental. Dover: Dover Publications Inc., 1986. ISBN 978-0-4862-4243-9
- Duffy, Joseph; Jackson, Michael. "Chronicle: St. Macartan, Patron of Clogher (506-2006)". Clogher Record, volume 20, No. 1, 2009. pp. 113–122. JSTOR 20641370
- Hourihane, Colum. The Grove Encyclopedia of Medieval Art and Architecture, Volume 1. Oxford: Oxford University Press, 2012. ISBN 978-0-1953-9536-5
- Lucas, Anthony. "The Social Role of Relics and Reliquaries in Ancient Ireland". The Journal of the Royal Society of Antiquaries of Ireland, volume 116, 1986. JSTOR 25508904
- Mahr, Adolf. "Irish Early Christian Handicraft Archived 9 July 2021 at the Wayback Machine. Limerick: Limerick Leader, 1939
- Moss, Rachel. Medieval c. 400—c. 1600: Art and Architecture of Ireland. Yale University Press, 2014. ISBN 978-03-001-7919-4
- Overbey, Karen. Sacral Geographies, Saints, Shrines and Terri tory in Medieval Ireland. Turnhout: Brepols, 2012. ISBN 978-2-5035-2767-3
- Overbey, Karen. "Locating the Book: The Domnach Airgid Shrine in Medieval Ireland". Medford, MA: Tufts University, 2006
- O'Curry, Eugene. "Lectures on the manuscript materials of ancient Irish history: delivered at the Catholic University of Ireland, during the sessions of 1855 and 1856 (1878)". ReInk Books, 2018; reprint of the 1878 edition
- O'Curry, Eugene. Lectures on the manuscript materials of ancient Irish history (1861). Sydney: Wentworth Press, 2016. ISBN 978-1-3714-8995-3
- O'Curry, Eugene. "Ancient Irish Historical Manuscripts". The Dublin Review, Thomas Richardson & Son, 1861
- O'Cróinín, Dáithí. The Cathach and Domnach Airgid. In: Cunningham, Bernadette; Fitzpatrick, Siobhán (eds), "Treasures of the Royal Irish Academy Library". Dublin: Royal Irish Academy, 2009. ISBN 978-1-9048-9054-6
- Ó Floinn, Raghnall. Treasures of the National Museum of Ireland: Irish Antiquities. Dublin: Gill & Macmillan, 2002. ISBN 0-7171-2829-6
- O Floinn, Raghnall. "Irish Goldsmiths' Work of the Later Middle Ages". Irish Arts Review Yearbook, volume 12, 1996. pp. 35–44. JSTOR 20492877
- Orpen, Goddard. "The Domnach Airgid by E. C. R. Armstrong and H. J. Lawlor". The English Historical Review, volume 33, no. 132, October 1918. pp. 531–533. JSTOR 550937
- O'Toole, Fintan. A History of Ireland in 100 Objects. Dublin: Royal Irish Academy, 2013. ISBN 978-1-9089-9615-2
- Petrie, George. "An account of an ancient Irish reliquary, called the Domnach-Airgid. With 5 plates". In: "Transactions of the Royal Irish Academy", Volume XVIII, Antiquities, 1835–39. pp. 14–24
- Stalley, Roger. "Irish Art in the Romanesque and Gothic Periods". In: Treasures of early Irish art, 1500 B.C. to 1500 A.D: From the collections of the National Museum of Ireland, Royal Irish Academy, Trinity College Dublin Archived 6 June 2021 at the Wayback Machine. NY: Metropolitan Museum of Art, 1977. ISBN 978-0-8709-9164-6
