= National Museum of Ireland – Archaeology =

National Museum Ireland, Kildare Street
- Ard-Mhúsaem na hÉireann – Seandálaíocht
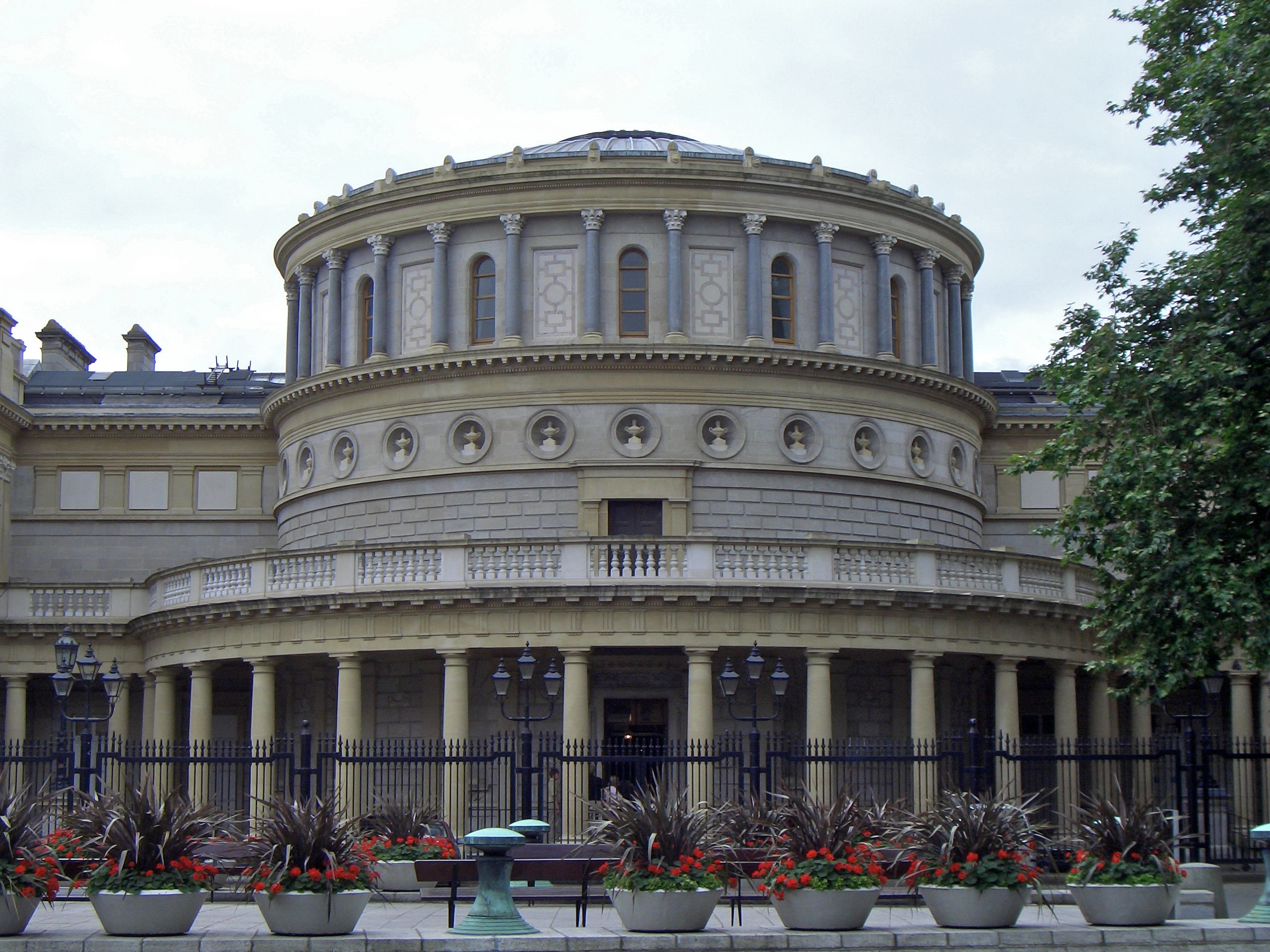
- Entrance to the museum

- Location of the museum in Dublin
- Established: 29 August 1890
- Location: Kildare Street, Dublin, Ireland
- Coordinates: 53°20′25″N 06°15′18″W
- Type: National museum
- Visitors: 505,420 (2019)
- Curators: Maeve Sikora, July, 2017 (Keeper)
- Public transit access: St Stephen's Green; Dublin Pearse; Dublin Bus routes: 39, 39a, 46a, 145
- Website: National Museum of Ireland, Kildare Street

National Museum of Ireland network
- Archaeology; Decorative Arts & History; Country Life; Natural History

The National Museum of Ireland, Kildare Street (Irish: Ard-Mhúsaem na hÉireann – Seandálaíocht") is a branch of the National Museum of Ireland located on Kildare Street in Dublin, Ireland, that specialises in Irish and other antiquities dating from the Stone Age to the Late Middle Ages.

Dublin Science and Art Museum Act 1877
- Act of Parliament
- Parliament of the United Kingdom
- Long title: An Act to authorise the Commissioners of Public Works in Ireland to acquire from the Dublin Royal Society and others Lands for the Erection of a Science and Art Museum in Dublin, and to establish a National Library in Dublin; and for other purposes.
- Citation: 40 & 41 Vict. c. ccxxxiv

Dates
- Royal assent: 14 August 1877

Text of statute as originally enacted

The museum was established under the Dublin Science and Art Museum Act 1877 (40 & 41 Vict. c. ccxxxiv). Before, its collections had been divided between the Royal Dublin Society and the Natural History Museum on Merrion Street. The museum was built by the father and son architects Thomas Newenham Deane and Thomas Manly Deane. The rotunda at the front of the National Museum matches that of the National Library of Ireland, which face each other across the front of Leinster House.

The National Museum of Ireland's collection contains artifacts from prehistoric Ireland including bog bodies, Iron and Bronze Age objects such as axe heads, swords and shields in bronze, silver and gold, with the earliest dated to c. 7000 BC. It holds the world's most substantial collection of post-Roman era Irish medieval art (known as Insular art). In addition, it houses a substantial collection of medieval metalwork, Viking artefacts including swords and coins, and classical objects from Ancient Egypt, Cyprus and the Roman world.

== History ==
The impetus for creating the museum was the 1877 Dublin Science and Art Museum Act, which combined the collections of the Royal Irish Academy (RIA) and Royal Dublin Society (RDS). This new law was enacted because the RIA recognised it needed government funding to continue its acquisition program and because becoming a state body allowed easier collaboration with the British Museum and National Museum of Scotland. The project was overseen by the palaeontologist Alexander Carte.

Among other early sources for the museum’s collection were works held by Trinity College Dublin and the Geological Survey of Ireland. These included such major pieces as the Cross of Cong (which the RIA acquired from an Augustinian priory in County Mayo) and the Domnach Airgid (acquired in 1847). In the mid-nineteenth century, the museum also acquired the collections of academy members such as Henry Sirr and Petrie (who left some 1500 artifacts, including 900 from pre-history, six crosiers, and a number of bells and bell shrines).

Many of these pieces had been found in the 19th century by agricultural labourers when population expansion and new machinery led to the cultivation of land that had not been touched since the Middle Ages. George Petrie of the RIA and others who were members of the Royal Society of Antiquaries of Ireland intervened to prevent these metalwork artifacts from being melted down and repurposed as mere metal. Discovery of such objects continues to the present day; recent major discoveries include the 8th century Tully Lough Cross, found in 1986, and the Clonycavan bog bodies, found in 2003.

In 1908, the museum was renamed the National Museum of Science and Art, and in 1921, following Irish independence, it was renamed the National Museum of Ireland.

== Building and interior ==
The original museum was titled the Dublin Museum of Science and Art, and located between the Royal Dublin Society in Leinster House and the Natural History Museum in Merrion Street. The museum's storage and display requirements became too large for these locations, and a new museum was built on Kildare Street. Opened on 29 August 1890, it was designed by Thomas Newenham Deane and his son, Thomas Manly Deane, in the Victorian Palladian style. The columns around the entrance and the domed rotunda are made from Irish marble and bear influence from both 18th century neoclassical design and the Pantheon in Rome. The stone on the exterior is mostly Leinster granite, with the columns formed from sandstone excavated at Mountcharles, County Donegal.

The mosaic floors in the interior contain scenes from classical mythology. Although laid out in the 19th century by the Manchaster-based artist Ludwig Oppenheimer, they were covered for decades until cleaned and restored in 2011. The wooden doors were carved by either William Milligan of Dublin or Carlo Cambi of Siena, Italy, while the fireplaces contain majolica tiles by the UK-based Burmantofts Pottery. The balcony of the central court is held by rows of thin cast-iron columns containing ornate capitals decorated with groups of cherubs.

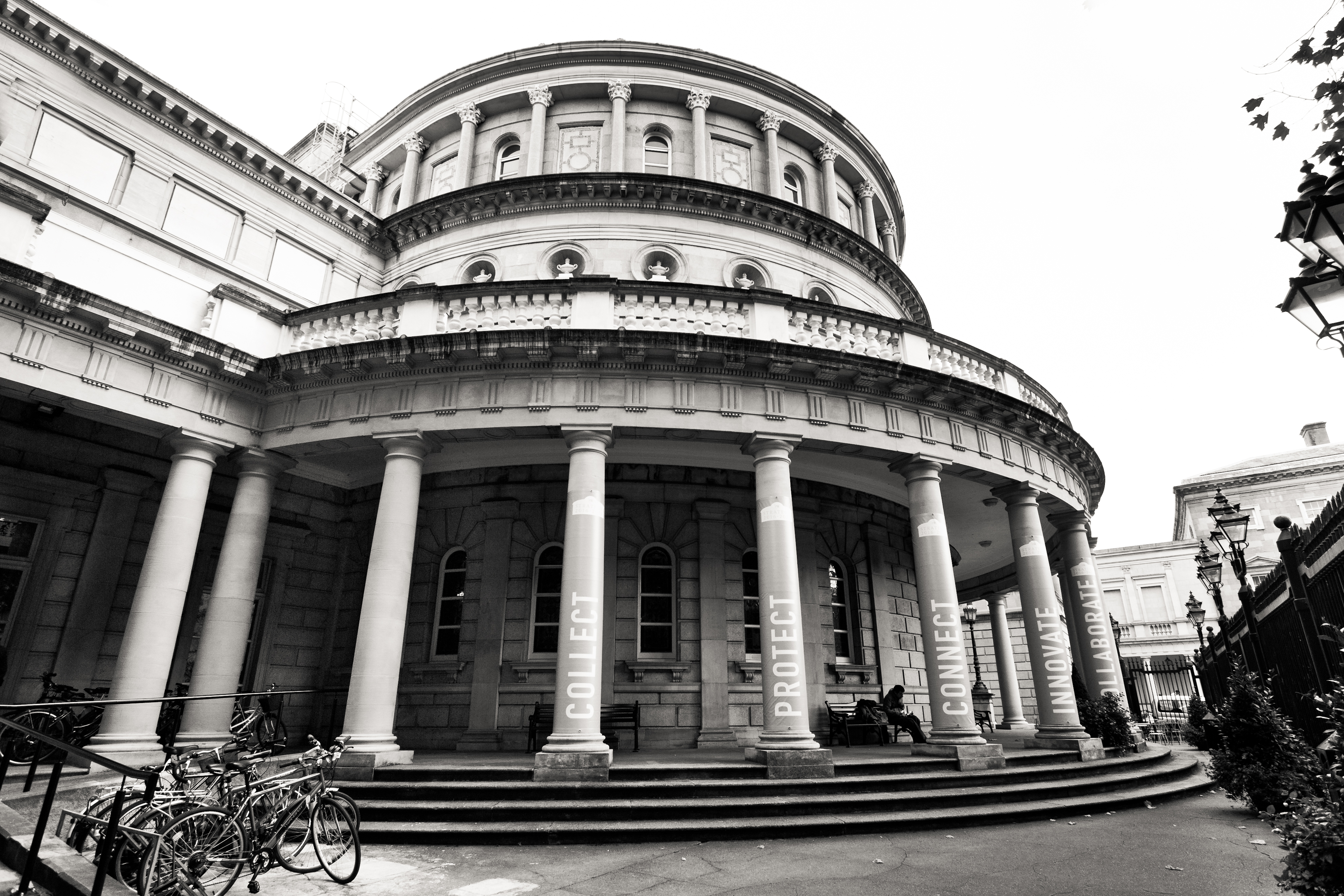
Columns and domed rotunda at the entrance

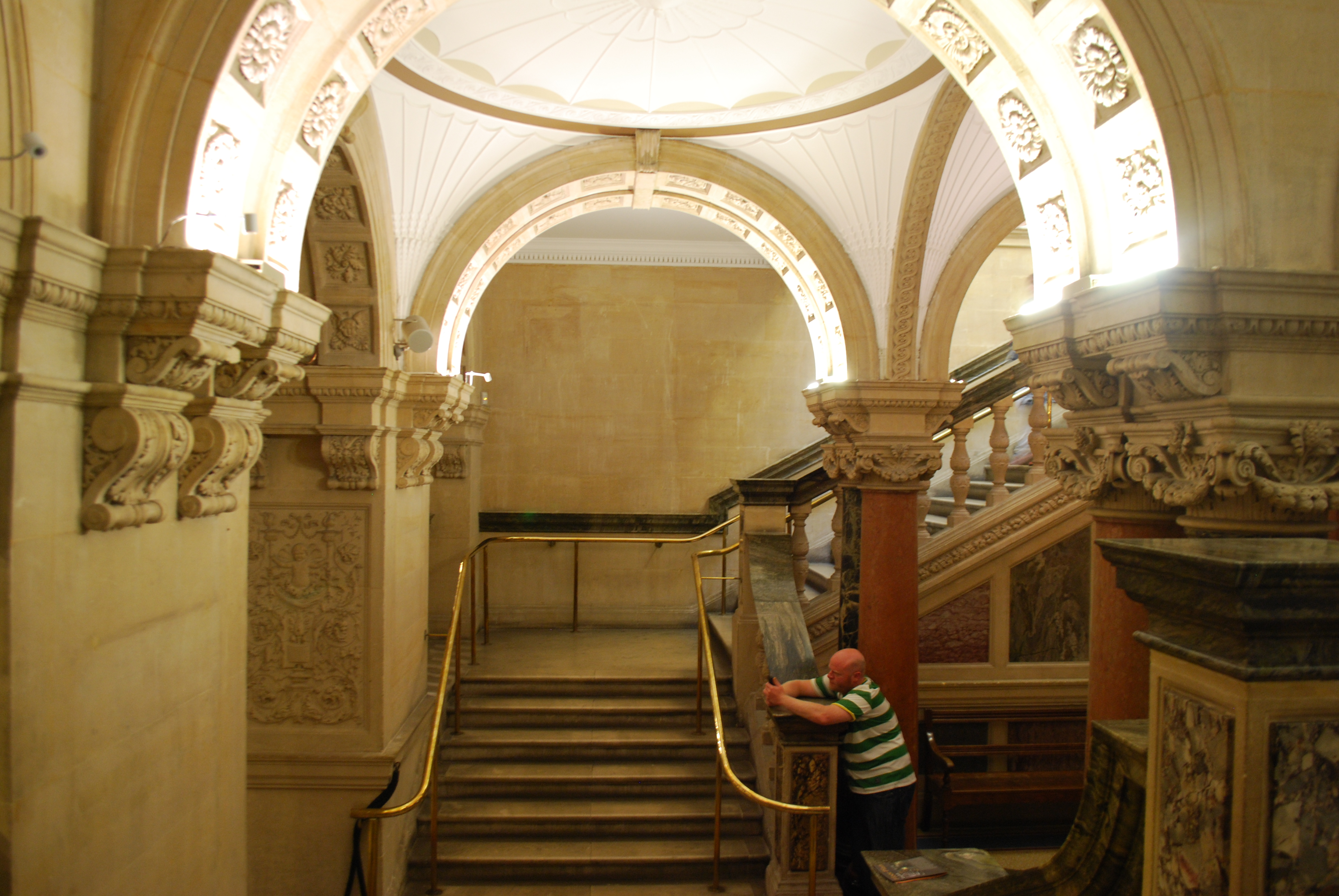
Stairway between the museum's two floors

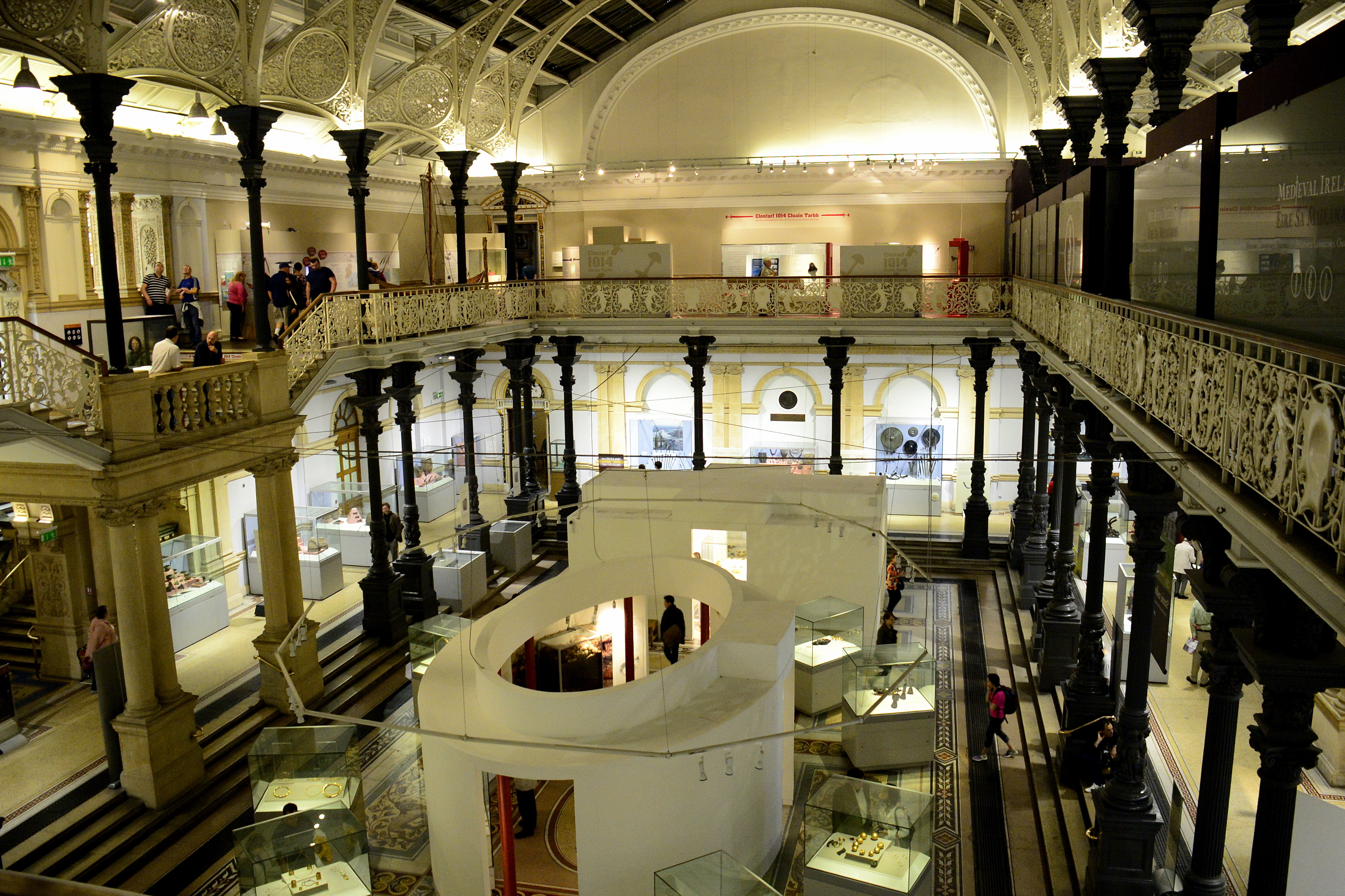
View from the centre court overlooking the goldwork exhibition hall

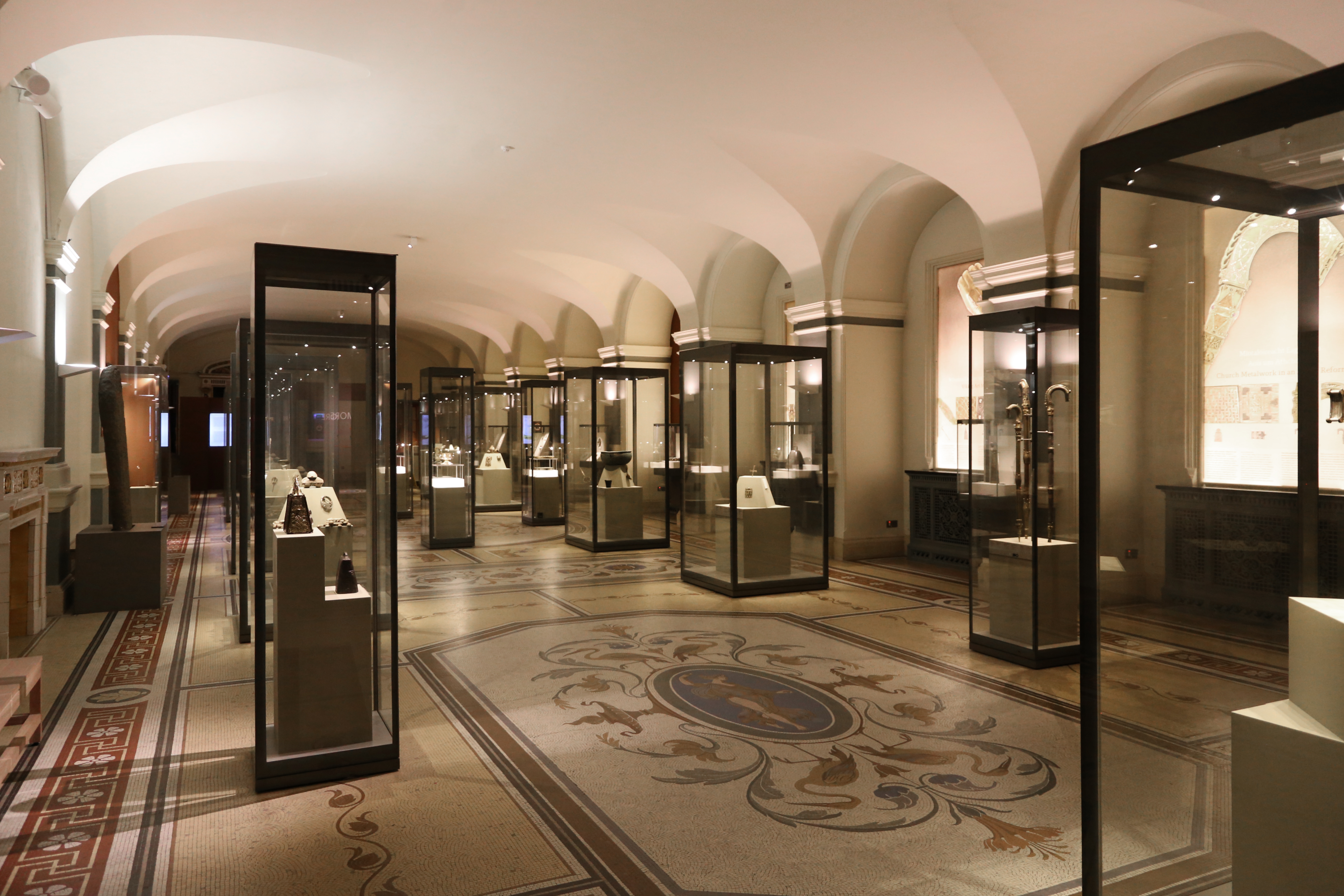
Treasury room

== Collection ==
The NMI has a number of large permanent exhibits, mainly of Irish historical objects and also a few smaller exhibits on the ancient Mediterranean, including galleries on Ancient Egypt, as well as "Ceramics and Glass from Ancient Cyprus".

=== Prehistoric ===
==== Stone age to early metallurgy ====
The museum's prehistoric Ireland exhibit contains artefacts from the earliest period of human habitation in Ireland (just after the Last Glacial Period) up to the Celtic Iron Age. The collection includes numerous stone implements created by the first hunter-gatherer colonists from around 7000 BC, as well as tools, pottery and burial objects left by Neolithic farmers. Some notable artefacts include four rare Jadeite axeheads imported from the Alps of Neolithic Italy, and the unique ceremonial macehead discovered at the tomb of Knowth. The exhibit then covers the introduction of metallurgy into Ireland around 2500 BC, with early copper implements.

The museum has a large array of later Bronze Age period axes, daggers, swords, shields, cauldrons and cast bronze horns (the earliest known Irish musical instruments). There are a few very early Iron weapons. Wooden objects include a large dugout logboat, wooden wheels and cauldrons and ancient reed fishing equipment.

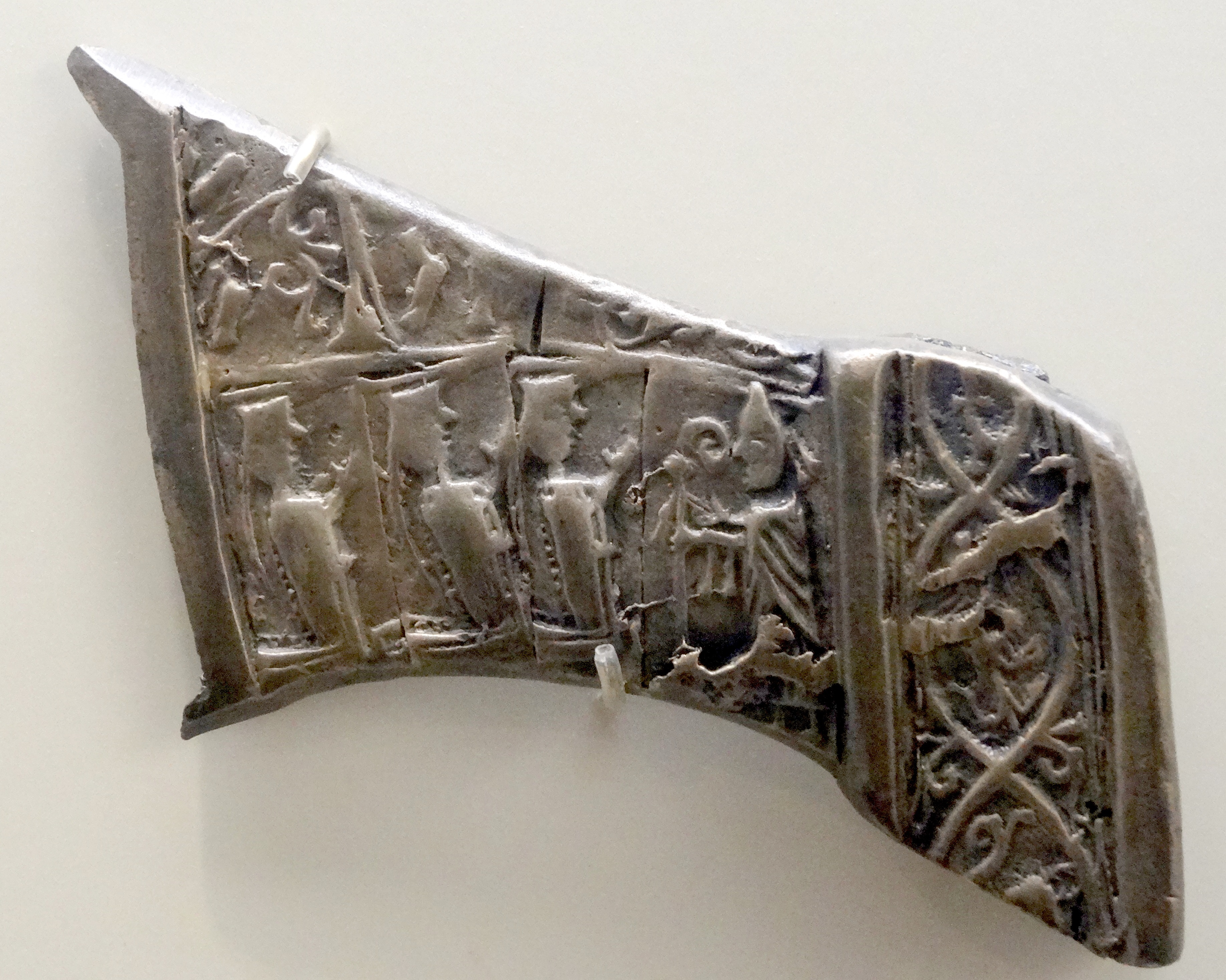
River Bann Axehead, Neolithic period

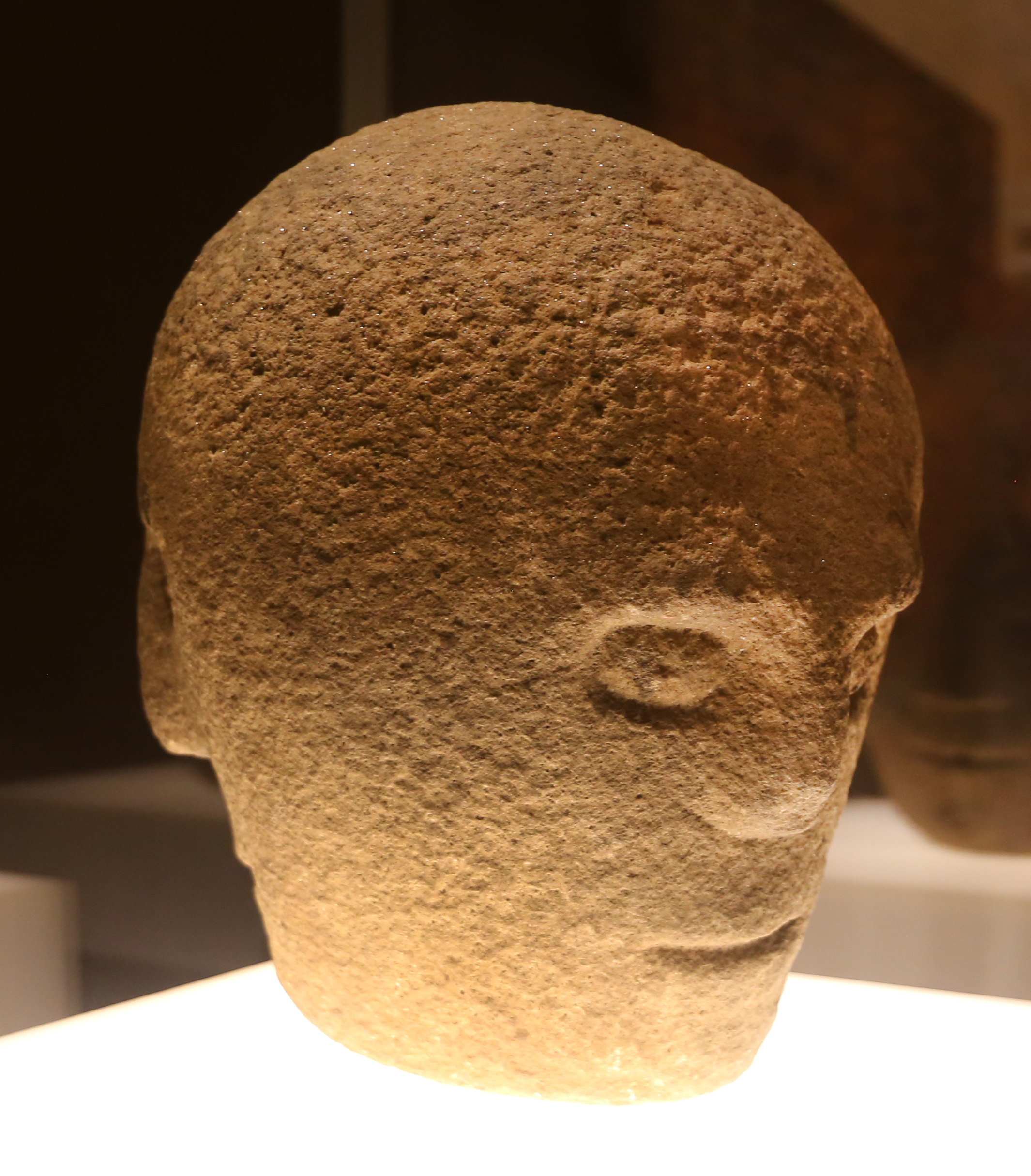
The Corleck Head, a 1st or 2nd century AD three-faced stone head found in Drumeague, County Cavan, Ireland c. 1855.

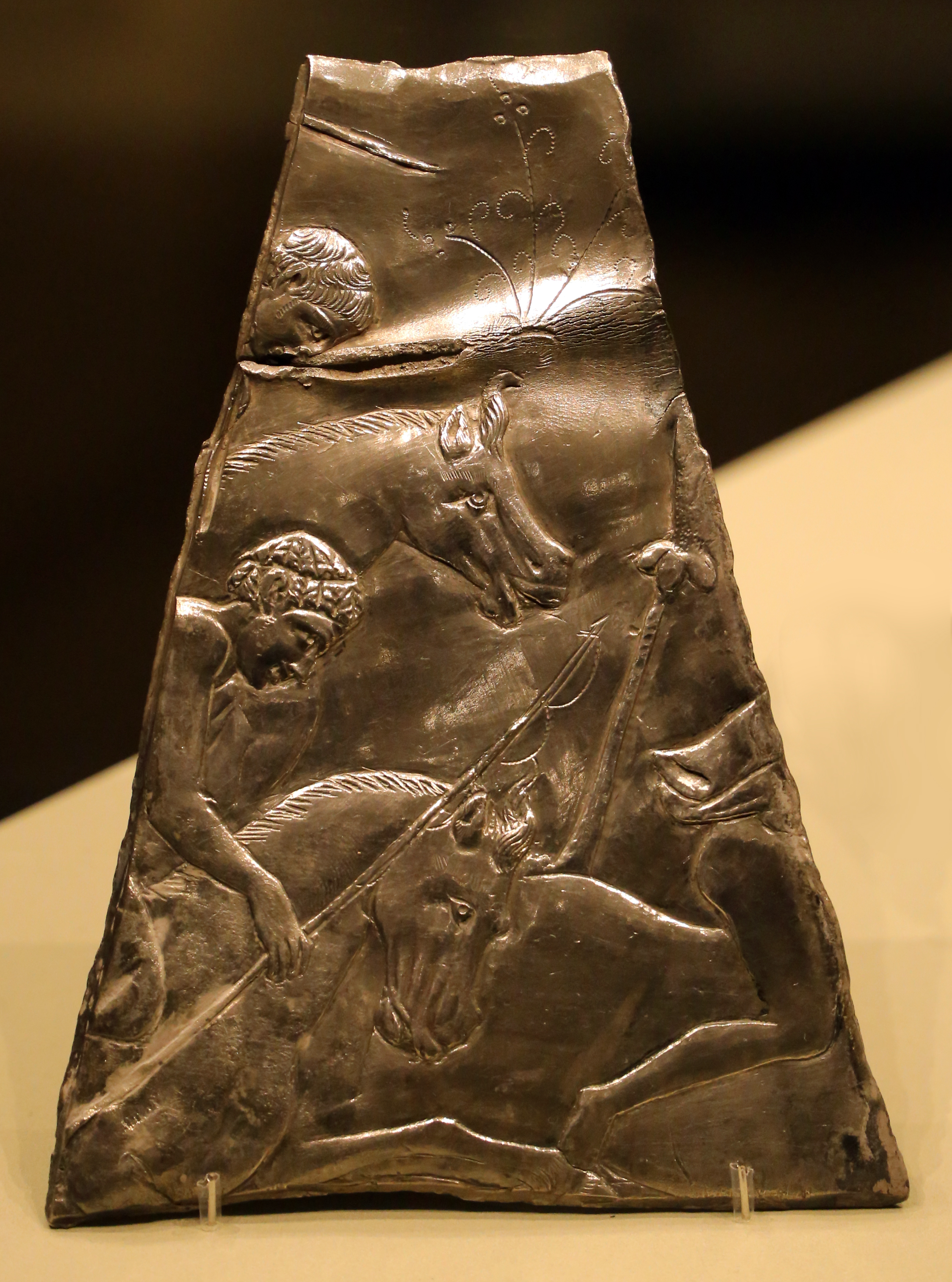
Votive offering in metal with relief of boys on horseback, Newgrange, County Meath, 2nd-4th century AD

==== Bronze age and goldwork ====
The NMI's collection of Bronze Age goldwork ranges from c. 2200 to 1800 B.C and is considered one of the "largest and most important" in Western Europe. The gold was recovered from river gravel and hammered into thin sheets used to create objects such as crescent-shaped collars (Gold lunula), bracelets and dress-fasteners. Most of the goldwork is probably jewellery, but many of the objects of are of unknown (possibly ritual) function.

By the middle Bronze Age new goldwork techniques were developed; from around 1200 BC a great variety of torcs were produced from twisting bars of gold. Items from the late Bronze Age (that is from c. 900 BC) include solid gold bracelets, dress-fasteners, large sheet gold collars, ear-spools and a necklace of hollow golden balls.

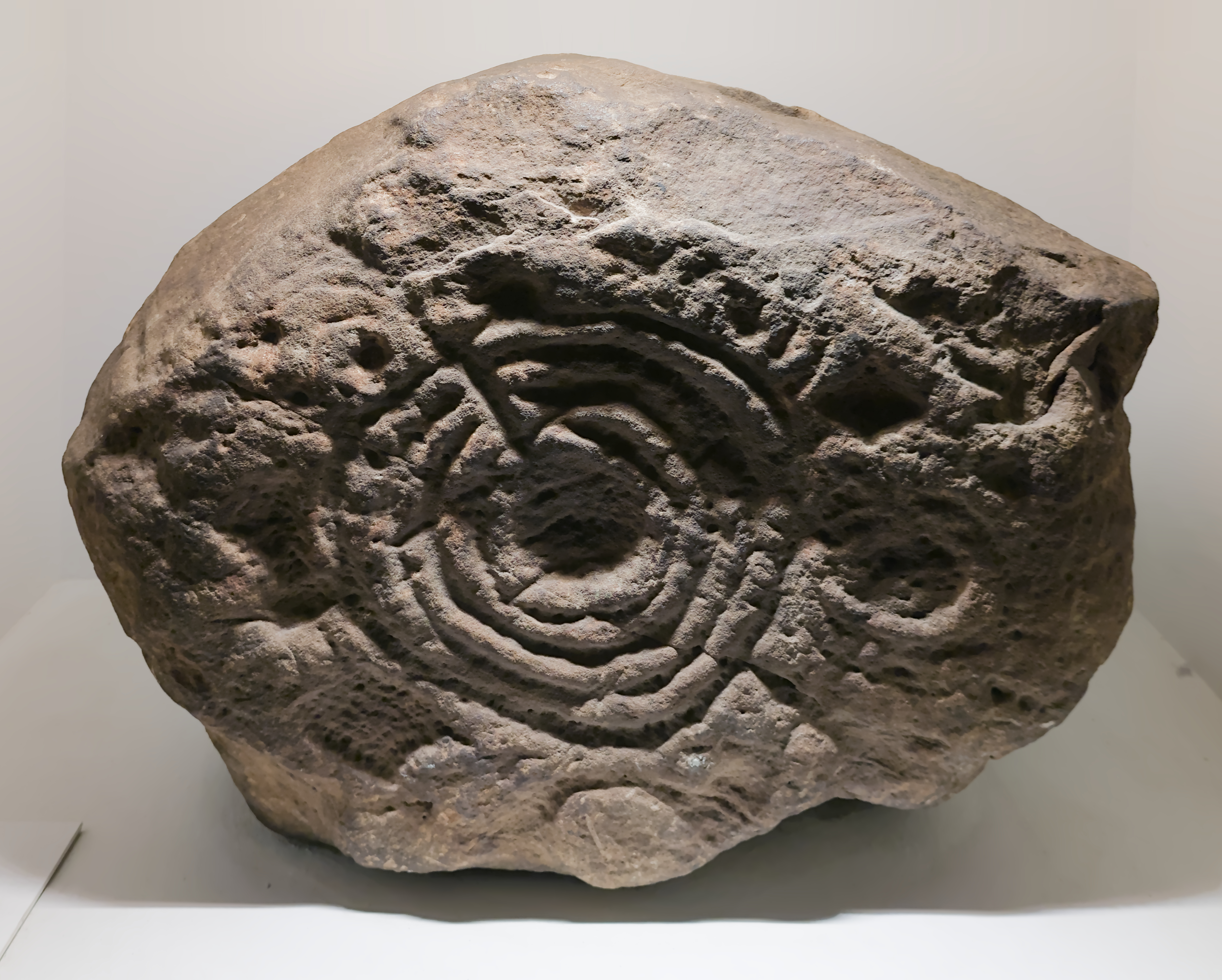
Decorated stone from Loughcrew, Co Meath, 2500-1700 BC

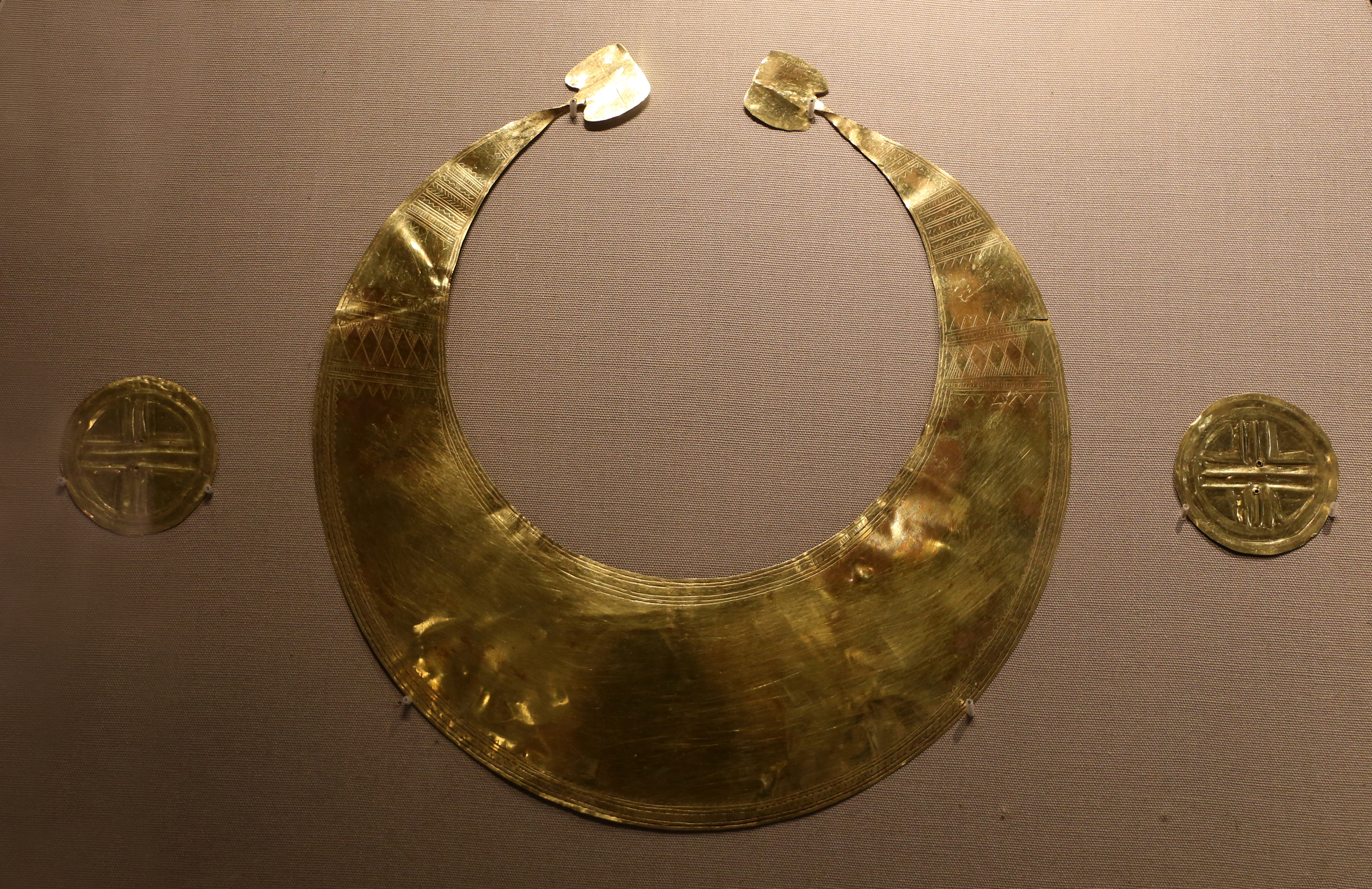
Gold lunula, Coggalbeg hoard, 2200-1800 BC

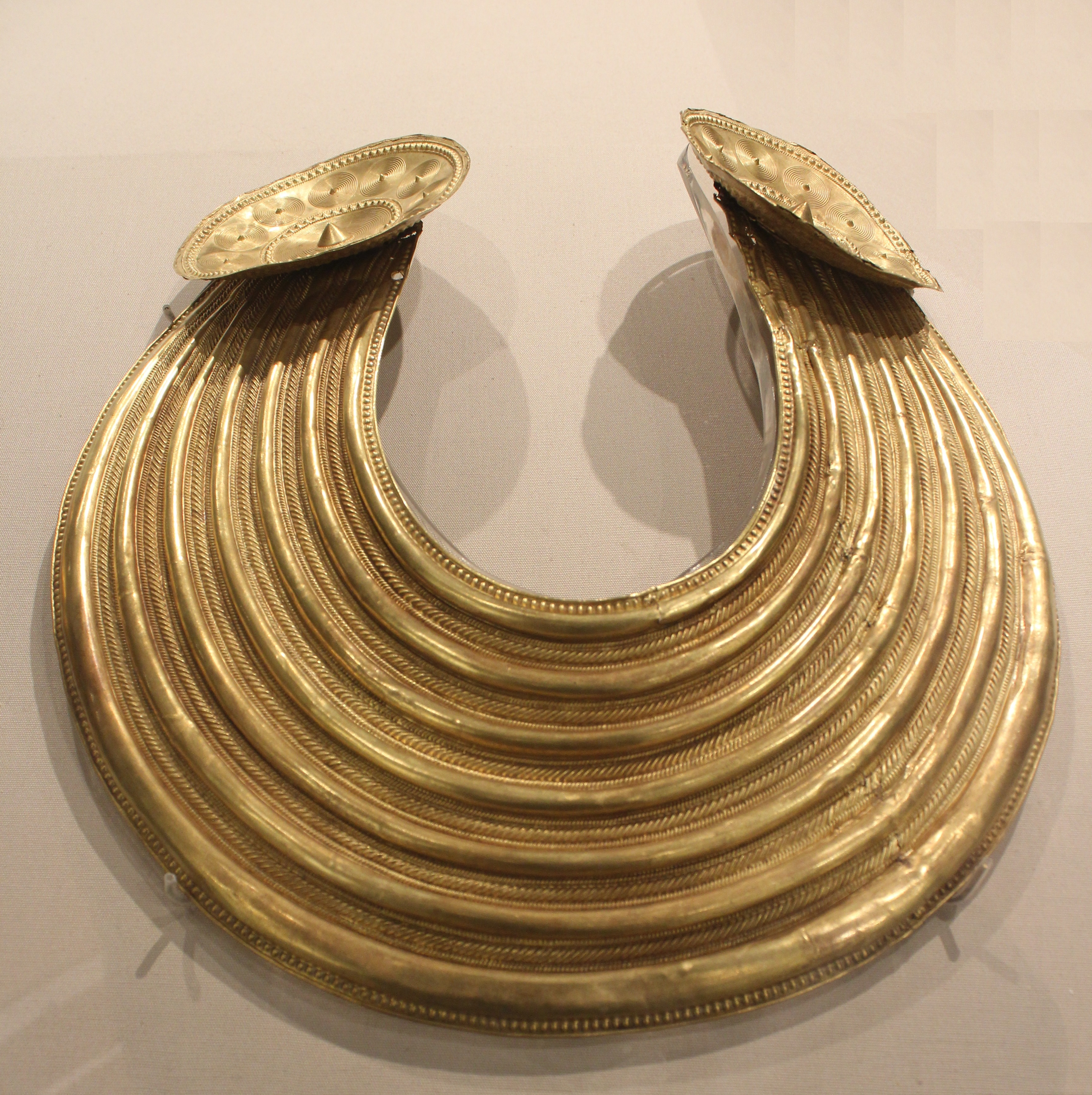
The Gleninsheen gorget, Co Clare, c. 800-700 BC

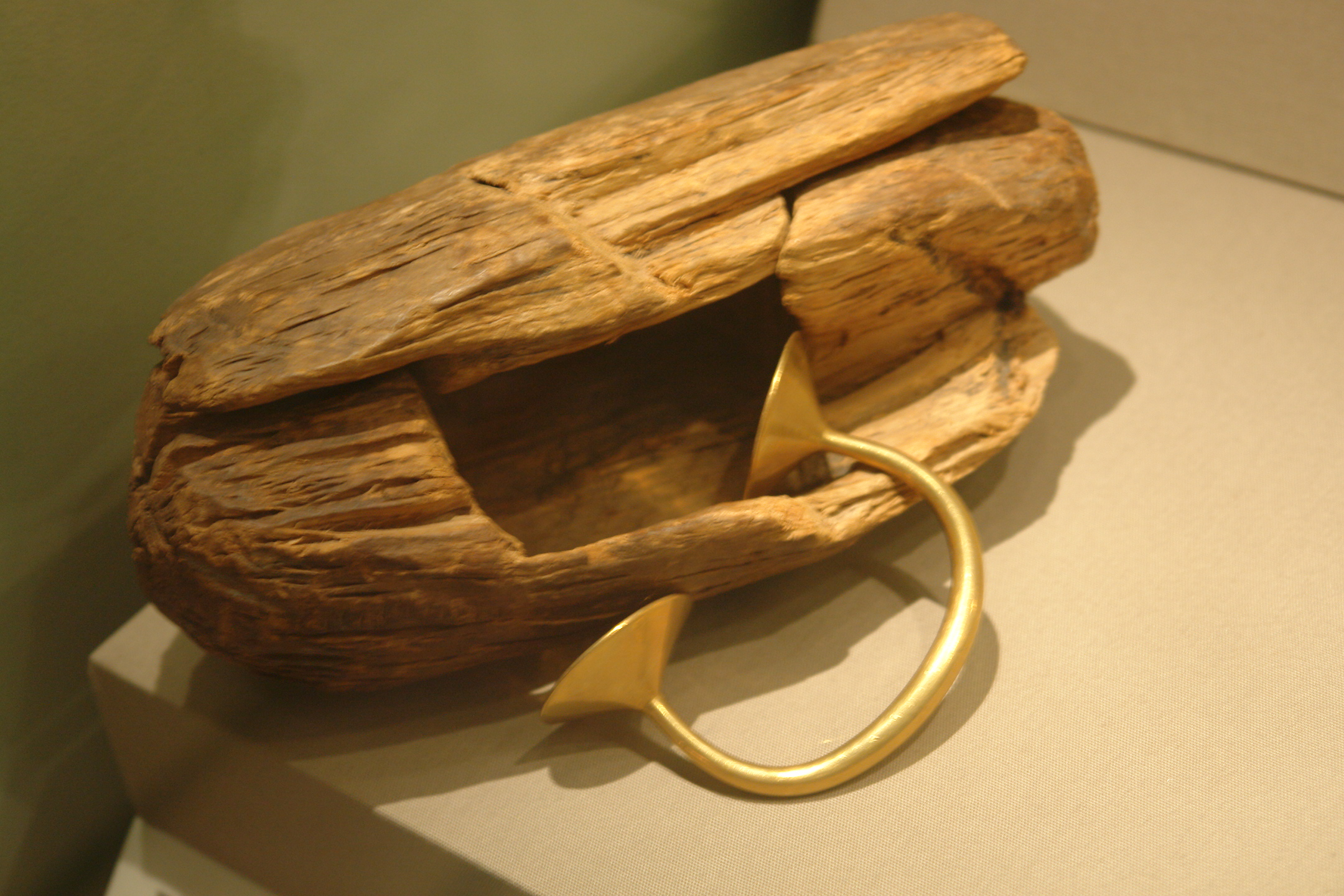
Gold dress fastener from Killymoom Demesne in County Tyrone (800-700 BC)

==== Bog bodies (Iron age) ====
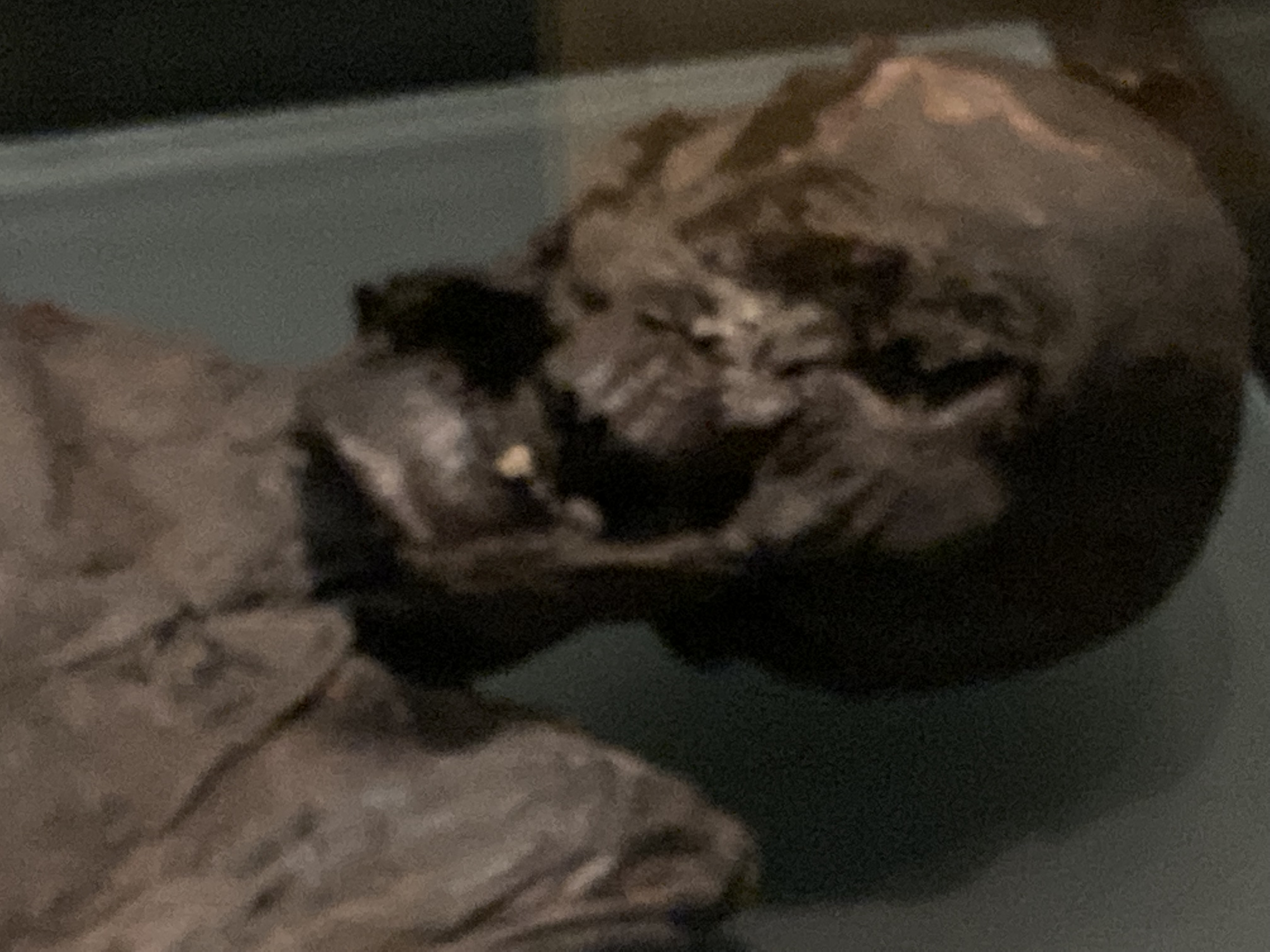
Gallagh Man, 470–120 BC

The museum contains a number of well-preserved Irish bog bodies dating to the Iron Age, some of which are believed to have been ritualistically sacrificed. The archaeologist Eamonn Kelly developed the theory that the bodies were tribal kings sacrificed by the community after failed in their kingship, drowned in pools of water at the boundary points of the tribal territory. Some seem to exhibit evidence of the so-called threefold death practice of strangulation, wounding and drowning. The bog bodies in the collection are Cashel Man (c. 2000 BC), believed to be the oldest fleshed bog body found in Europe, Gallagh Man (470-120 BC), Clonycavan Man (392 to 201 BC), Old Croghan Man (362 to 175 BC), and Baronstown West Man (242 to 388 AD).

The bodies in the NMI's collection are males aged 25 to 40 years old who died in violent and perhaps ritualistic circumstances. The withy hoop found around Gallagh Man's neck was probably used as a garrotte to strangle him; Although he may have been a criminal who was executed, the willow rope strongly suggests ritual sacrifice as they often appear for this purpose in early Irish mythological stories.

The bodies are shown alongside examples of the material culture of the Celtic Iron Age period, including metal weapons, horse trappings and wooden and leather pieces, including the Ralaghan Idol, an Iron Age carved wooden figure found in County Cavan.

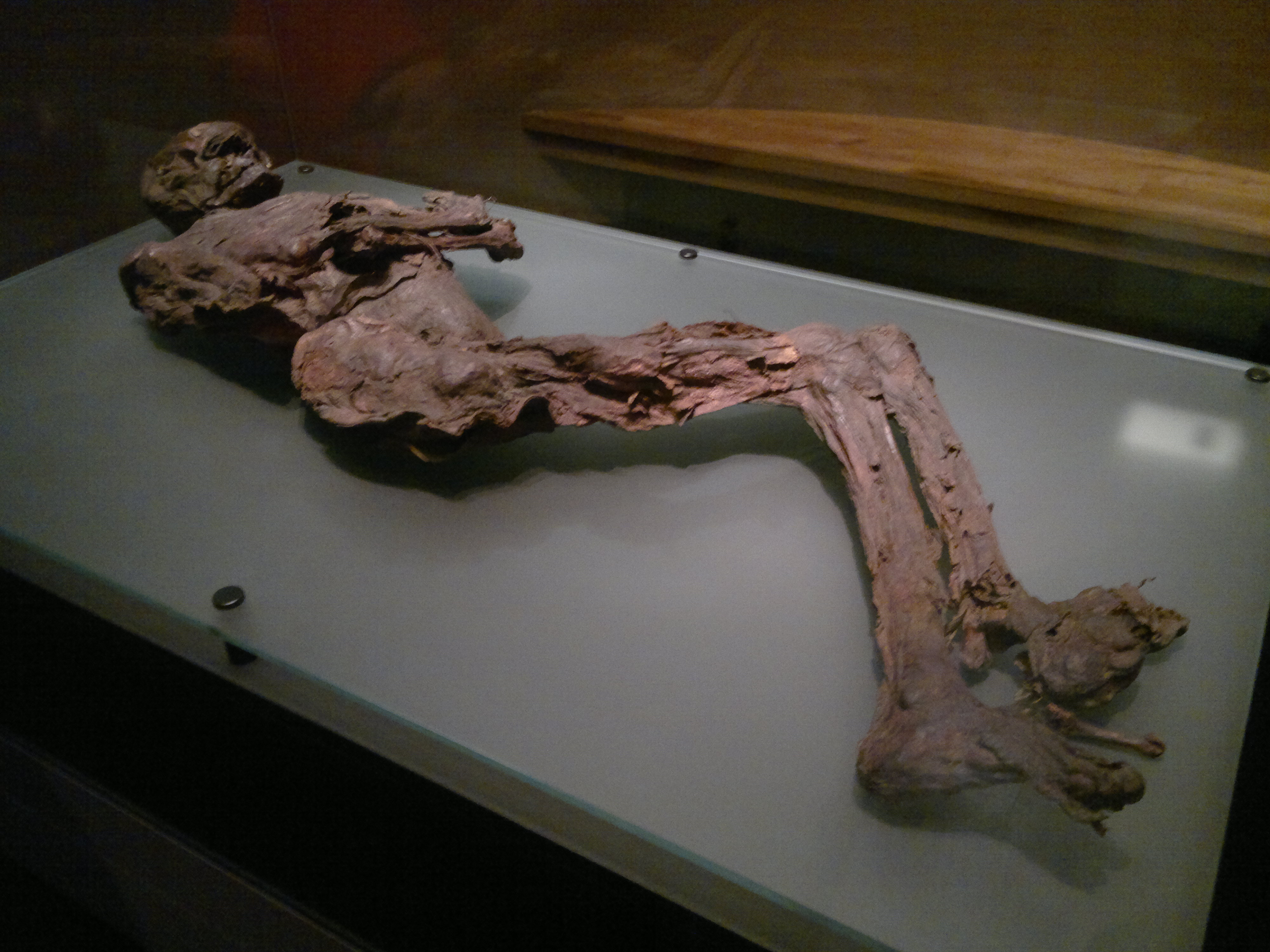
Gallagh Man, 470-120 BC, found in County Galway, 1821

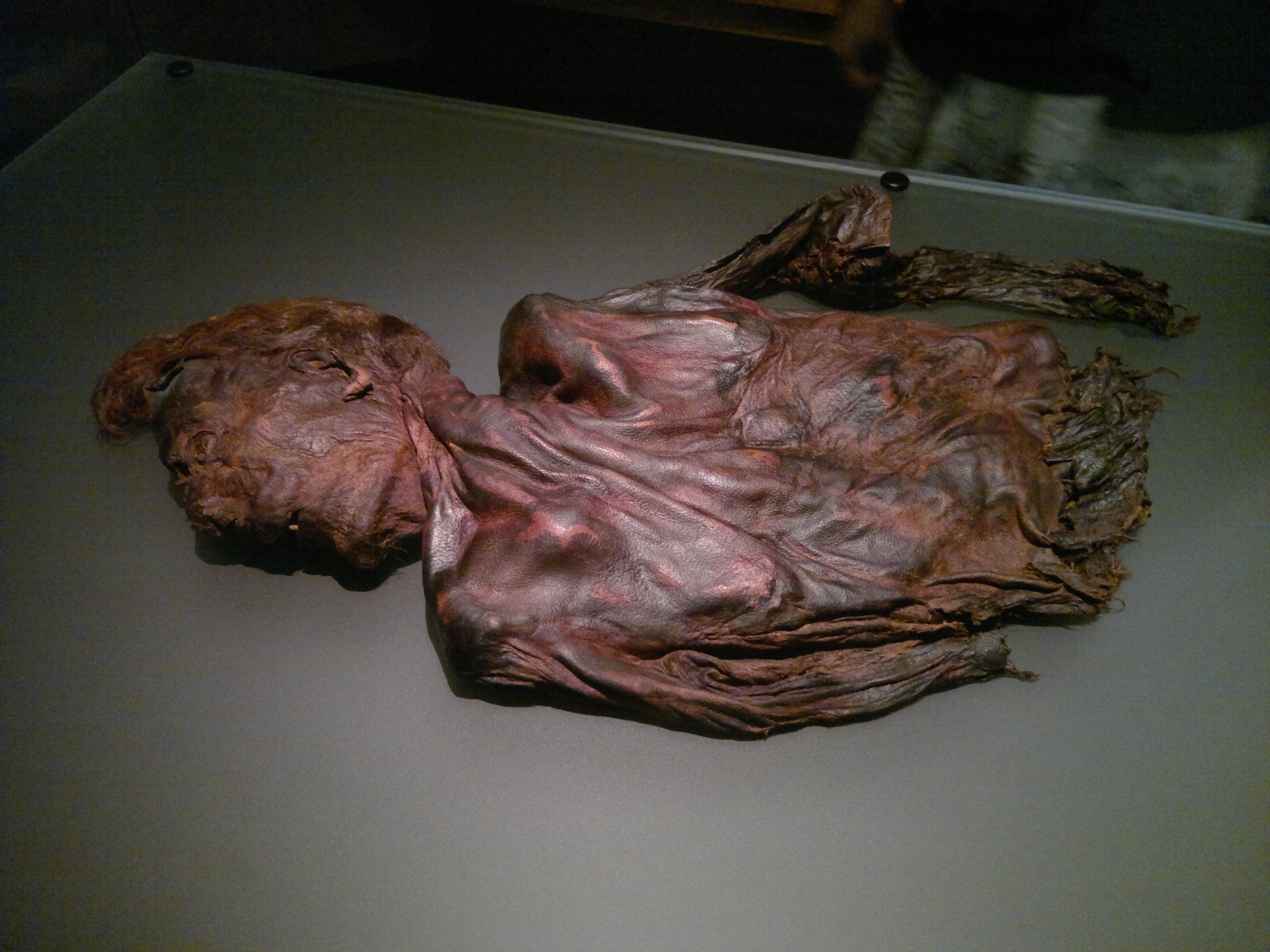
Clonycavan Man, 392 to 201 BC, found in County Meath, 2003

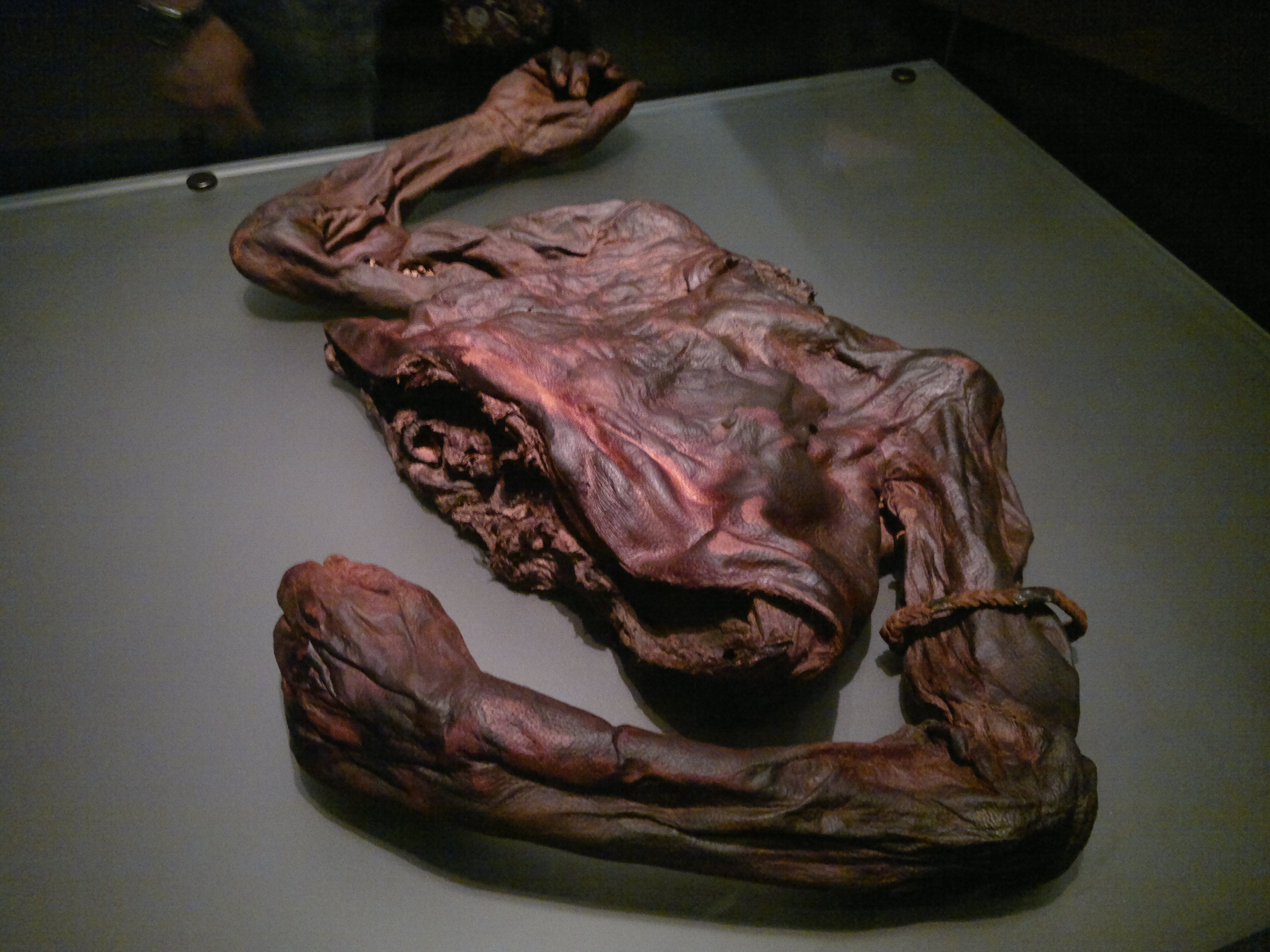
Old Croghan Man, 362 to 175 BC, found in County Offaly, 2003

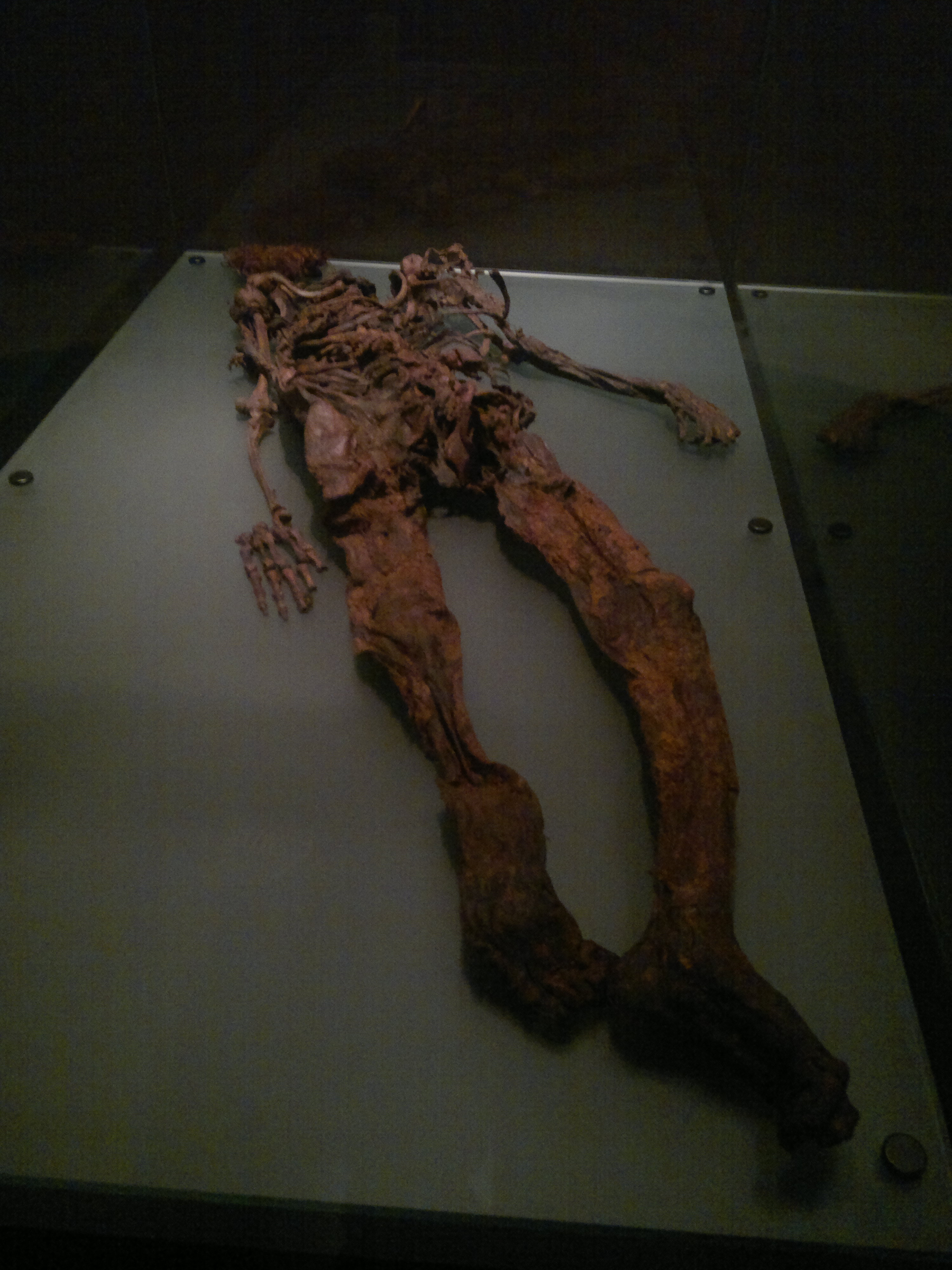
Baronstown West Man, 242 to 388 BC, found in County Kildare, 1953

=== Early Medieval ===
The museum's treasury room exhibits early medieval Christian and secular Irish metalwork dating from the late Iron Age to the late 12th century, and contains important pieces from both the La Tène and Insular periods. The earlier works shows growing influences from the Anglo-Saxon art from England as well as the Germanic areas of Europe, while many of the pieces after the late 8th century show the influence of Viking art.

==== Chalices, crosses, reliquaries, crucifixion plaques ====
The displays in the Treasury room are arranged chronologically, beginning with pieces such as the late 7th century Rinnegan Crucifixion Plaque, one of the earliest extant representations of the crucifixion in Irish art, and outside of illuminated manuscripts a rare example of both representation and a narrative scene in early Insular art.

Bell shrines are among the most numerous early medieval artifacts to survive. The best known examples in the museum's collection are St. Columba's bell and the bell and shrine of St. Patrick.

The so-called "Golden Age" of Irish art begins with ecclesiastical metalwork produced from the 8th-century, mainly reliquaries and liturgical vessels, including the 8th century Moylough Belt-Shrine and the 8th or 9th century Ardagh and Derrynaflan chalices. The impact of the Viking invasion can be seen in Irish metalwork after the early 10th century, both in an expansion of the available materials such as silver and amber, and the absorption of Scandinavian techniques and styles. This period coincides with an era of church reform Church and the beginning of secular patronage for artwork.

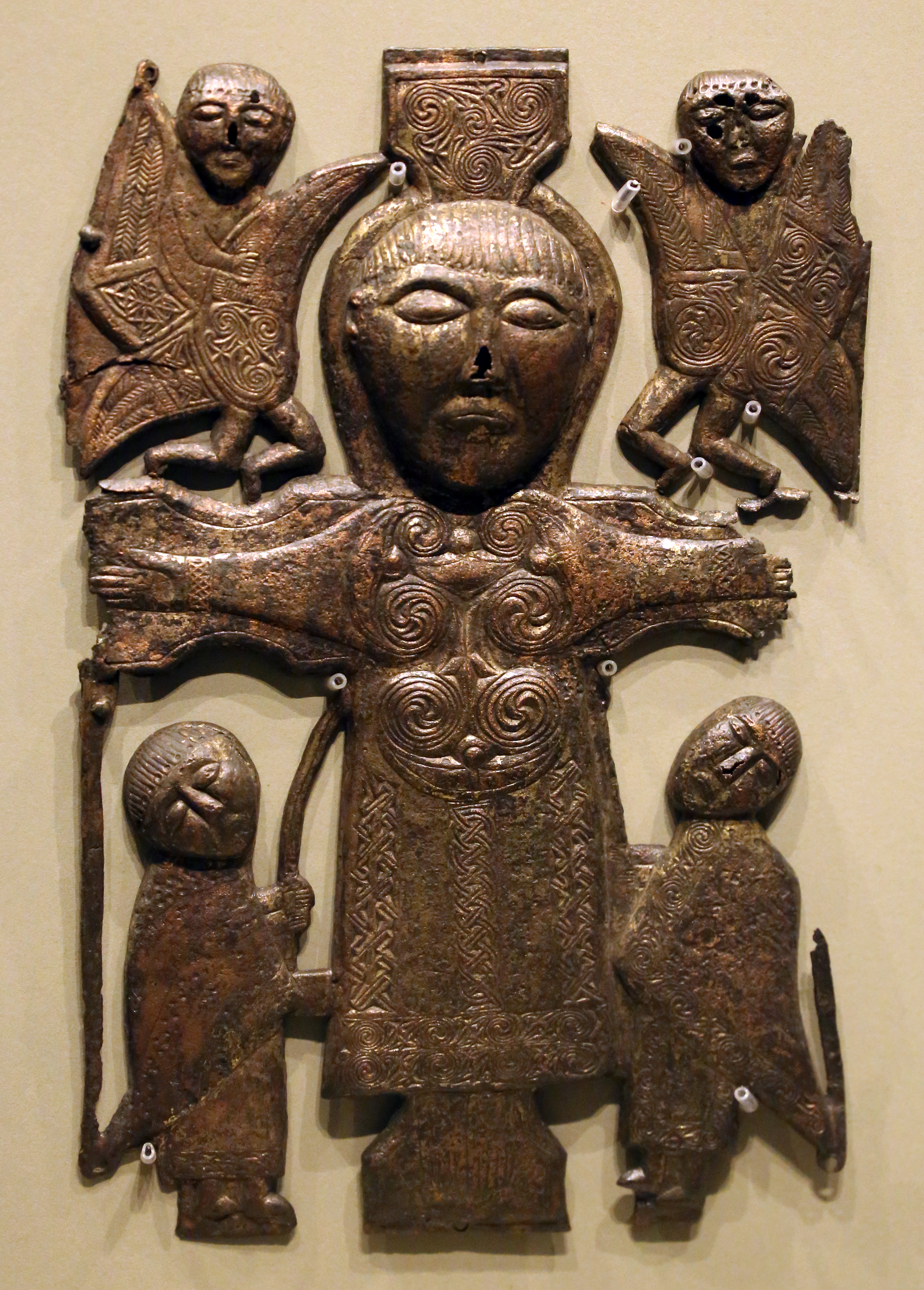
The Rinnegan Crucifixion Plaque, late 7th or early 8th century

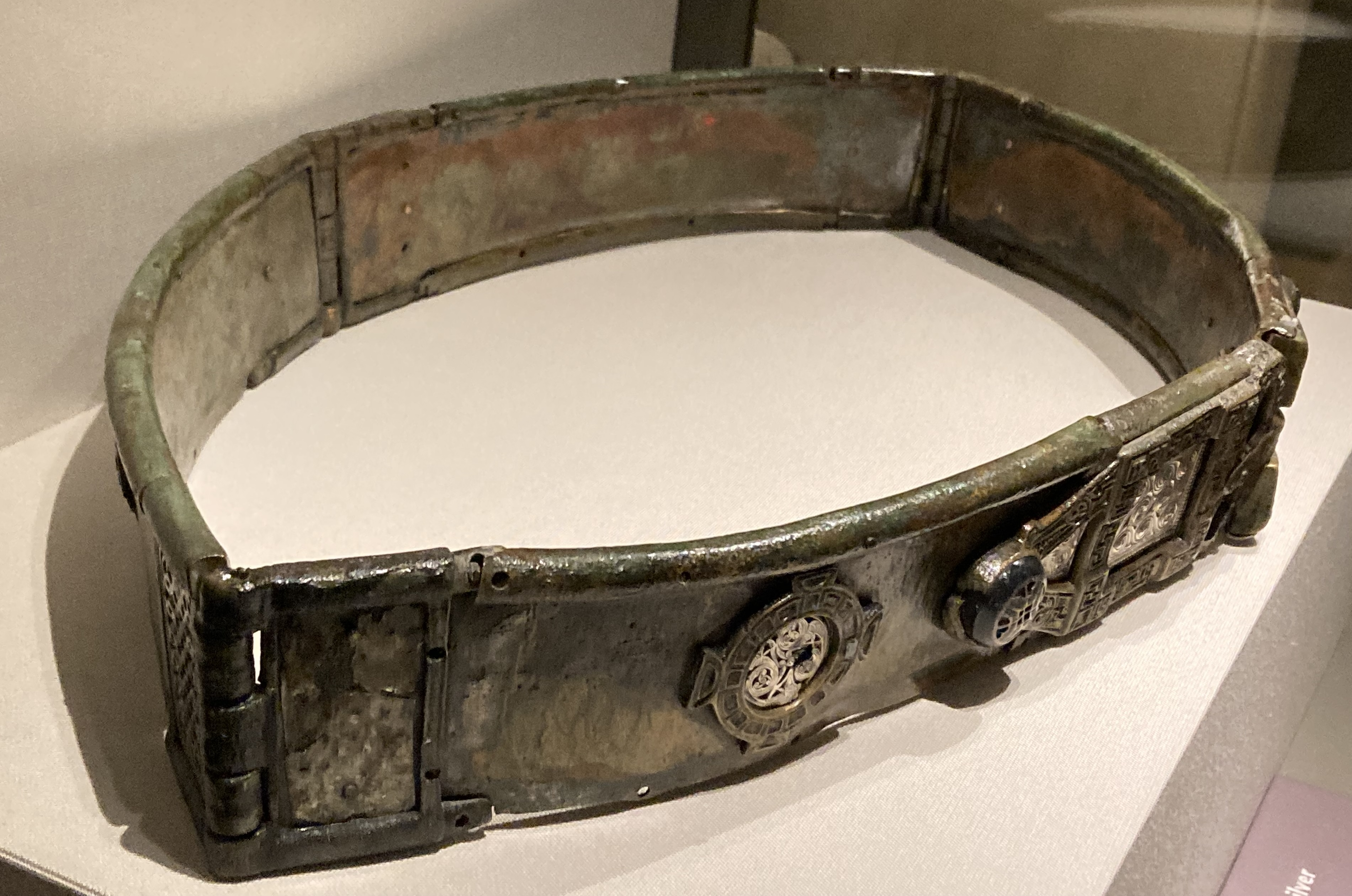
The Moylough Belt-Shrine, 8th century. Discovered in a bog in Sligo in 1945

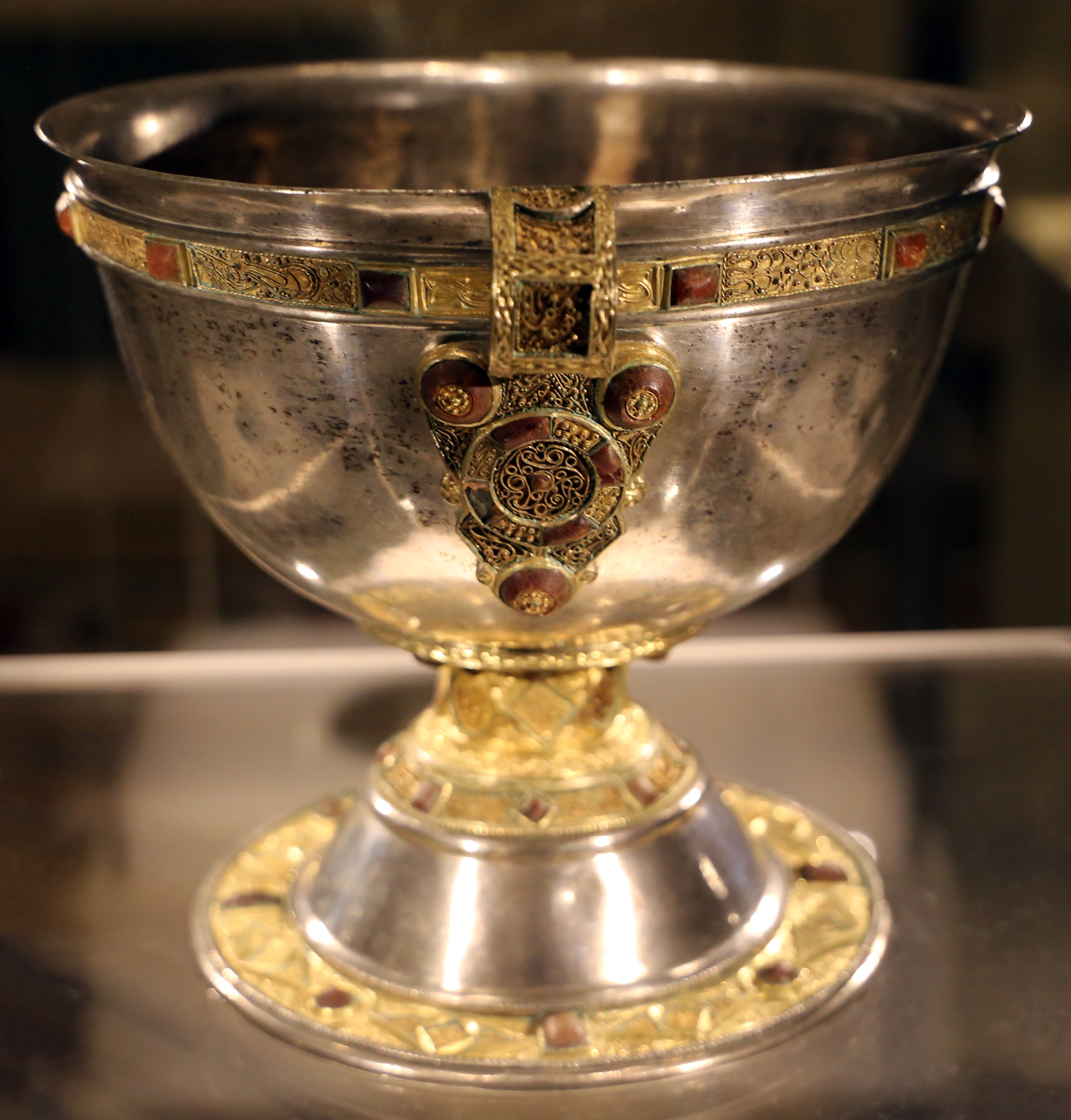
Chalice from the Ardagh Hoard, 8th- or 9th-century

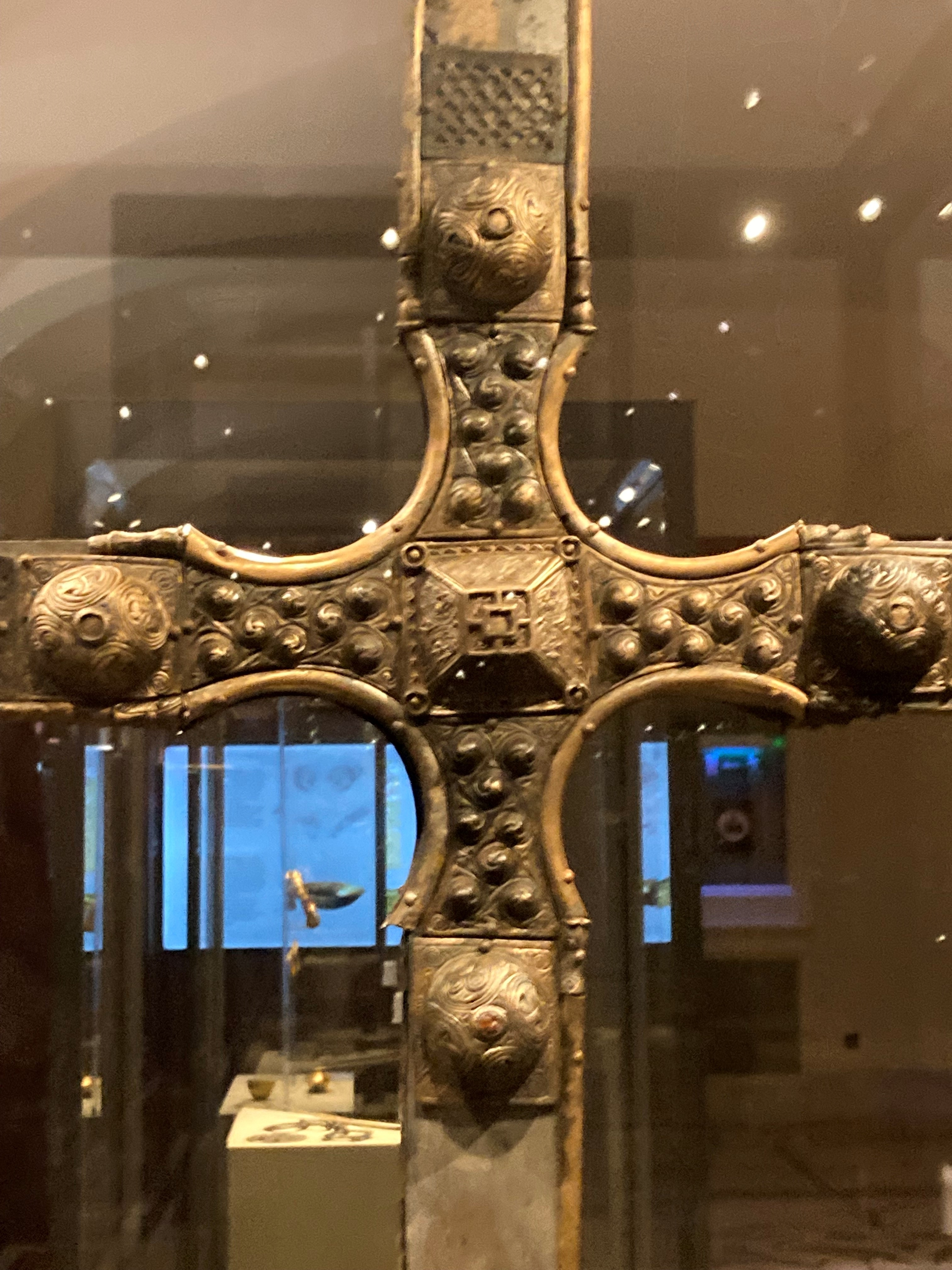
The Tully Lough Cross, 8th or 9th century. Bronze, gilt and tin mounted on wood

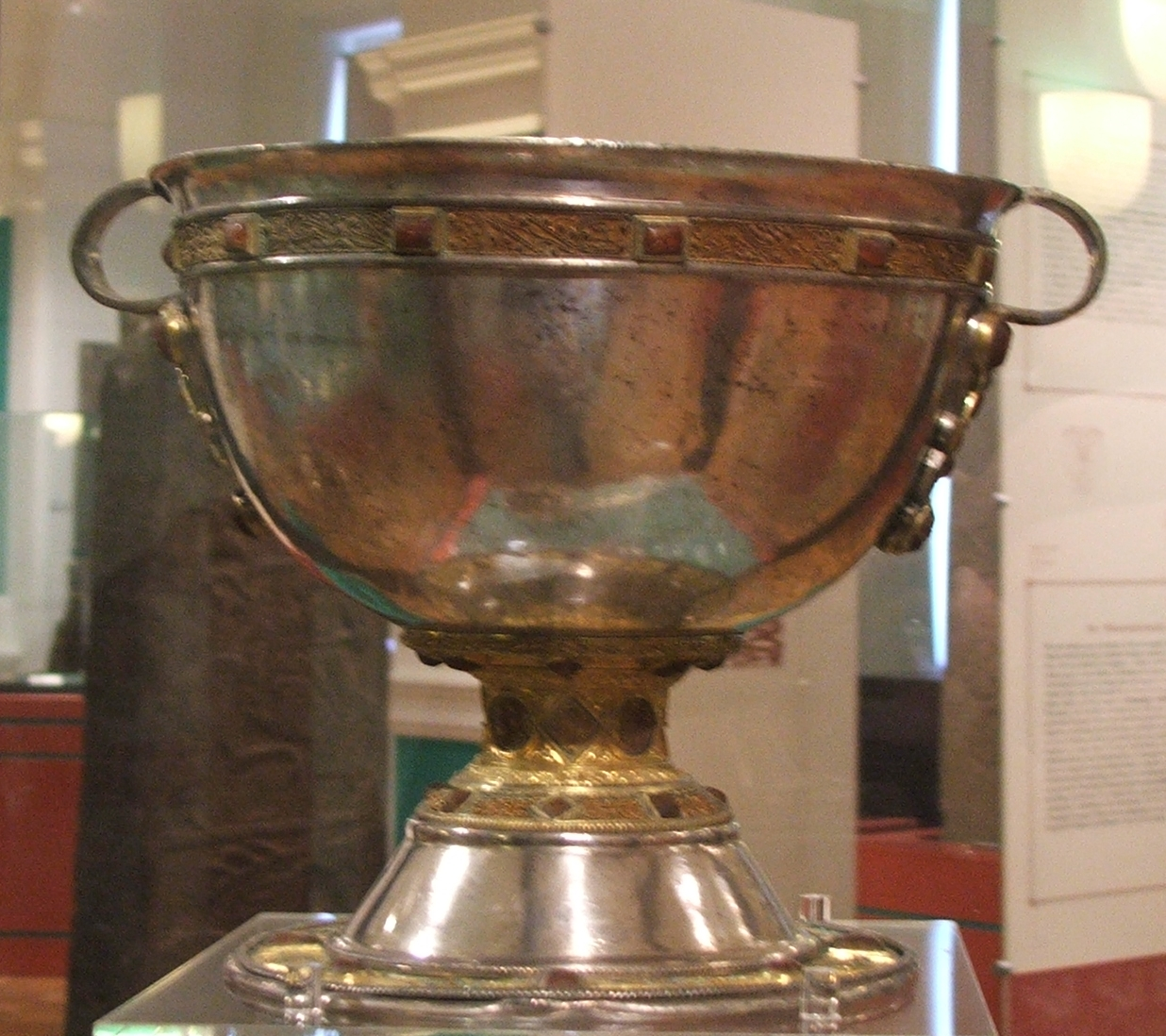
Derrynaflan Chalice, 8th- or 9th-century. Part of the Derrynaflan Hoard found in 1980 near Killenaule, County Tipperary.

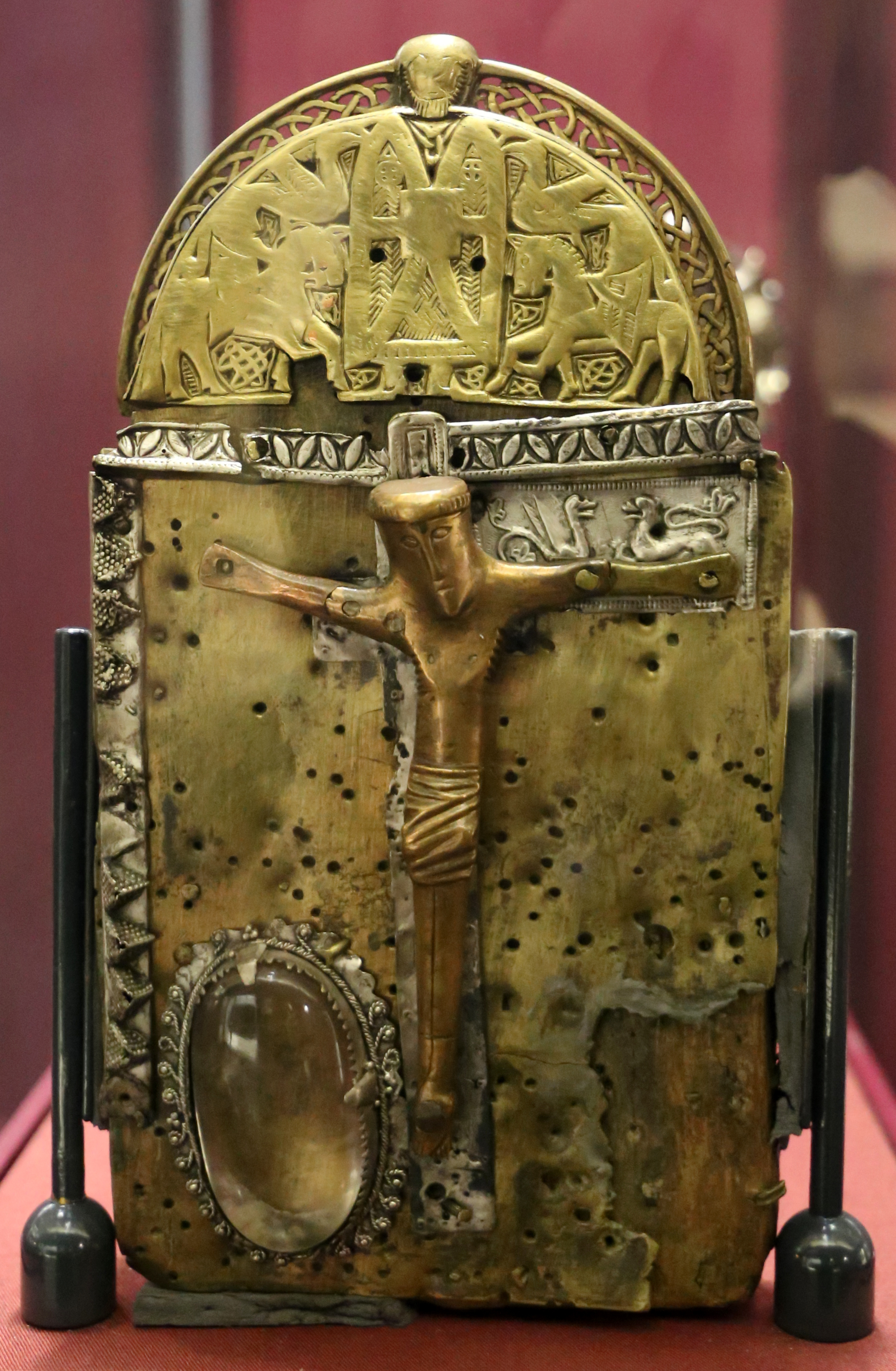
The Corp Naomh (sacred body) bell-shrine, 10th and 15th centuries

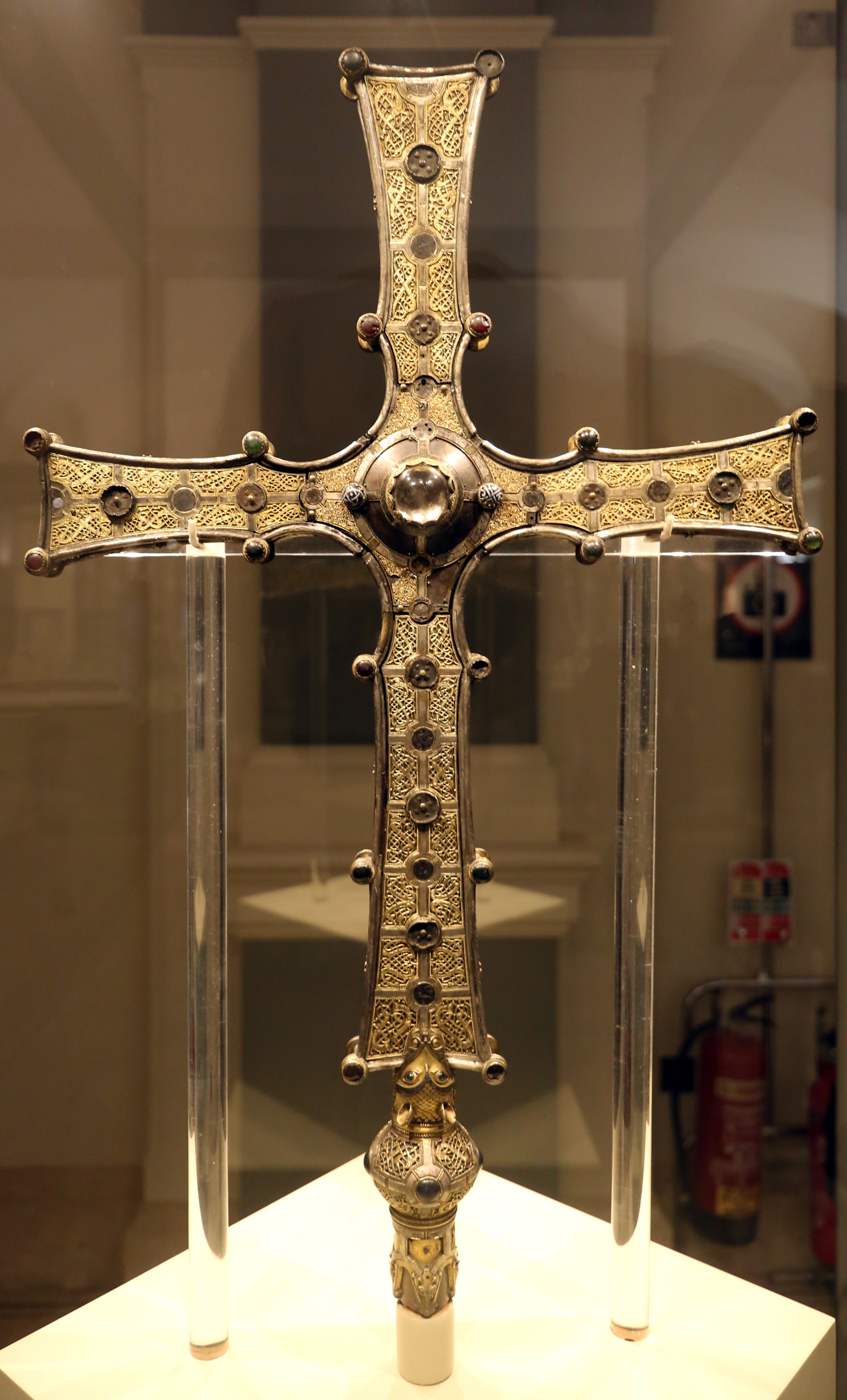
The Cross of Cong, early 12th-century

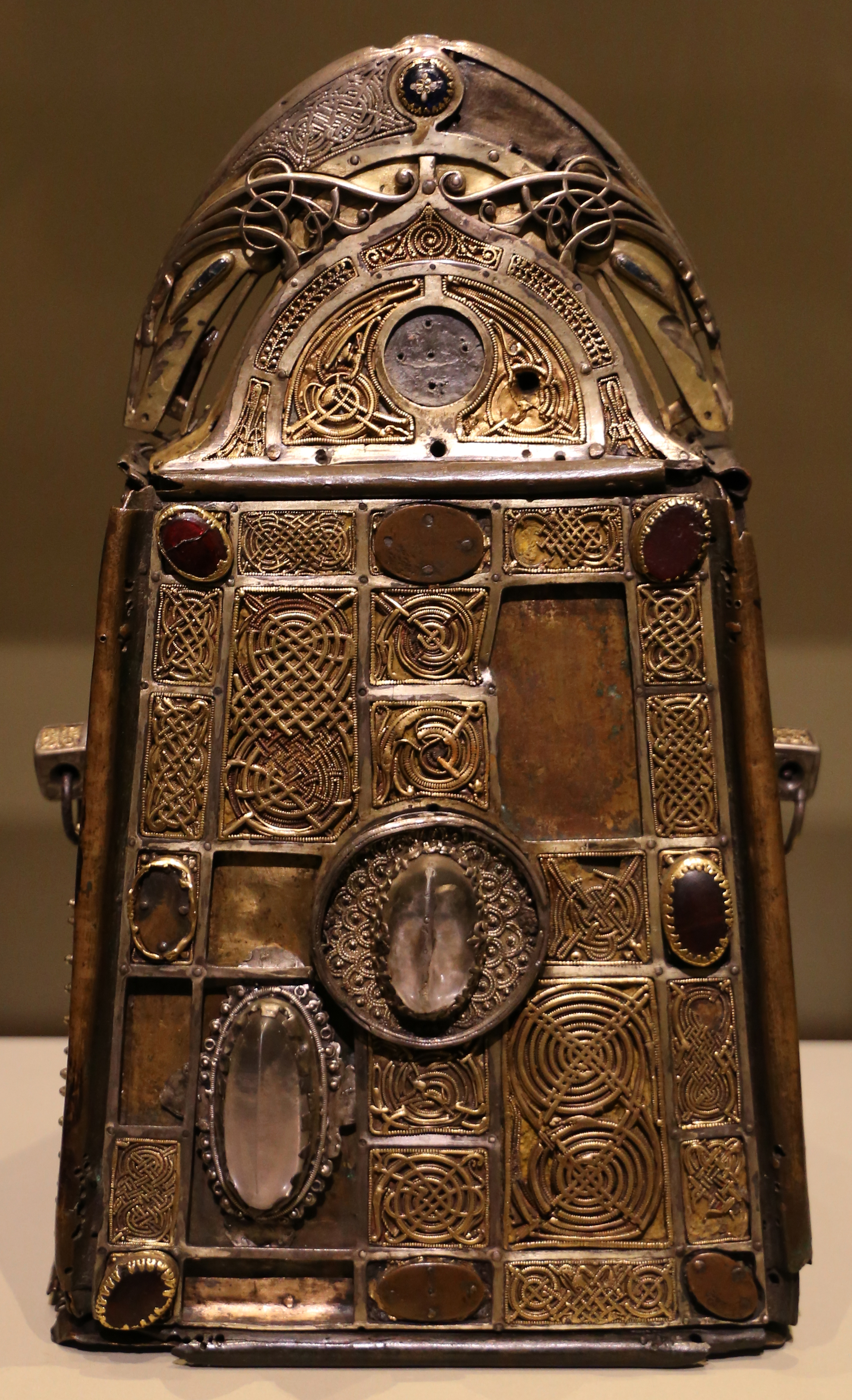
Shrine of St. Patrick's Bell, c. 1100

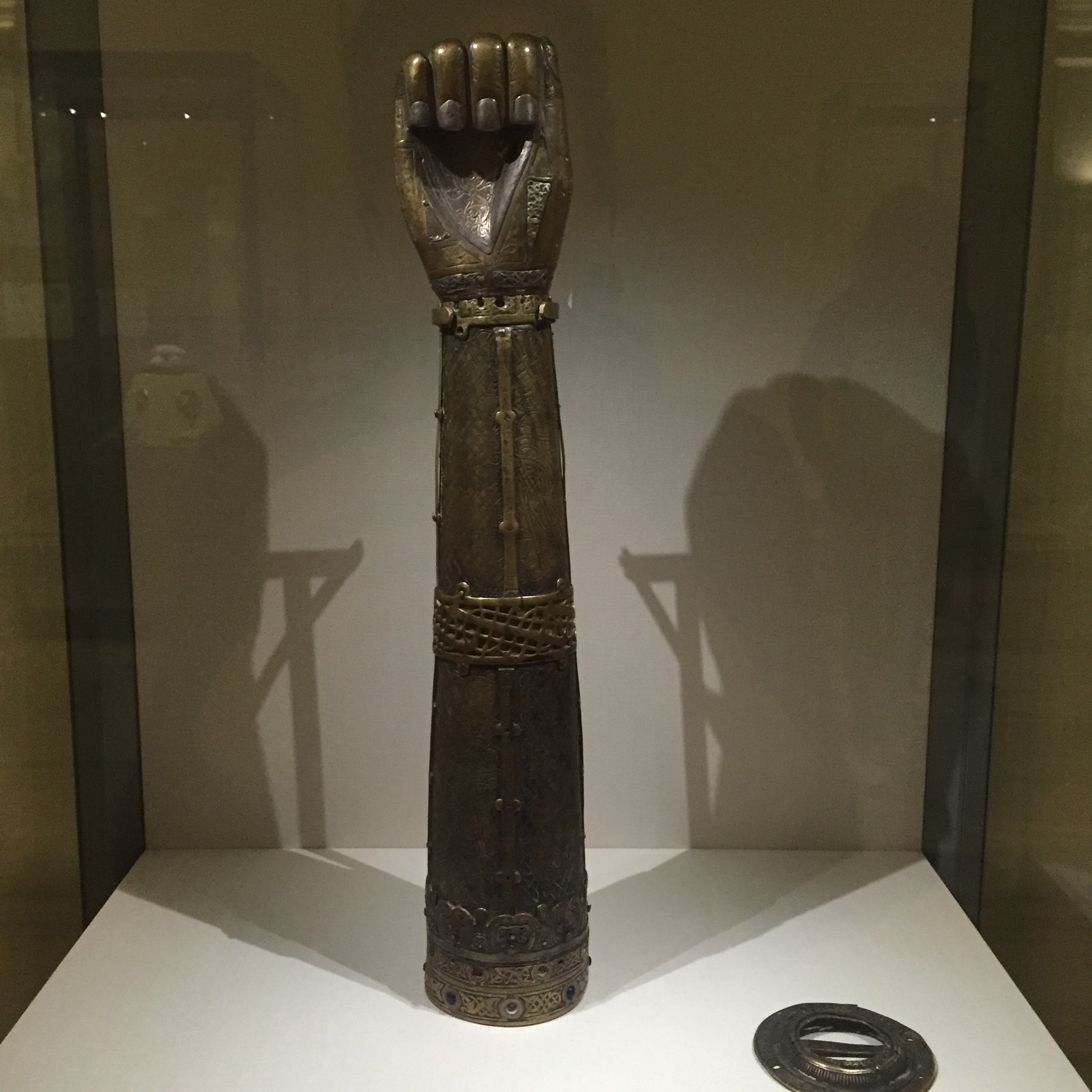
Shrine of Saint Lachtin's Arm, c. 1118–1121. A reliquary made of wood and metal shaped as an outstretched forearm and clenched fist.

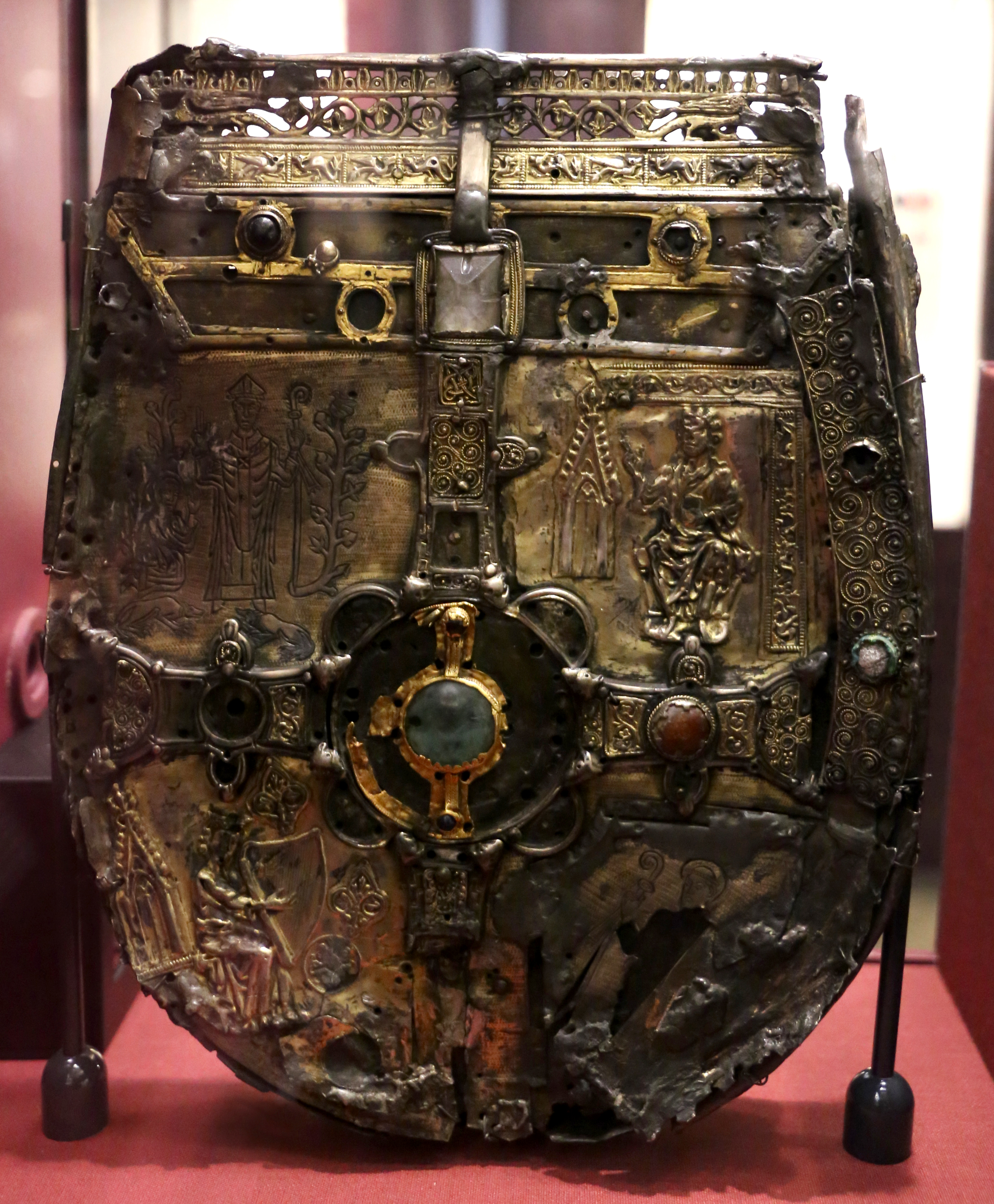
Shrine of St Patrick's Tooth, 12th and 14th centuries

As many of these objects were lost in antiquity and only re-discovered in the 19th and 20th centuries, the museum has played a key role in dating, restoring and preserving newly found objects. Major recent finds include the Tully Lough Cross, found in County Roscommon in 1986, and the Faddan More Psalter (c. 800 AD), discovered in a bog in July 2006 in the townland of Faddan More in north County Tipperary, which is held in an adjacent gallery to the Treasury.

==== Brooches ====
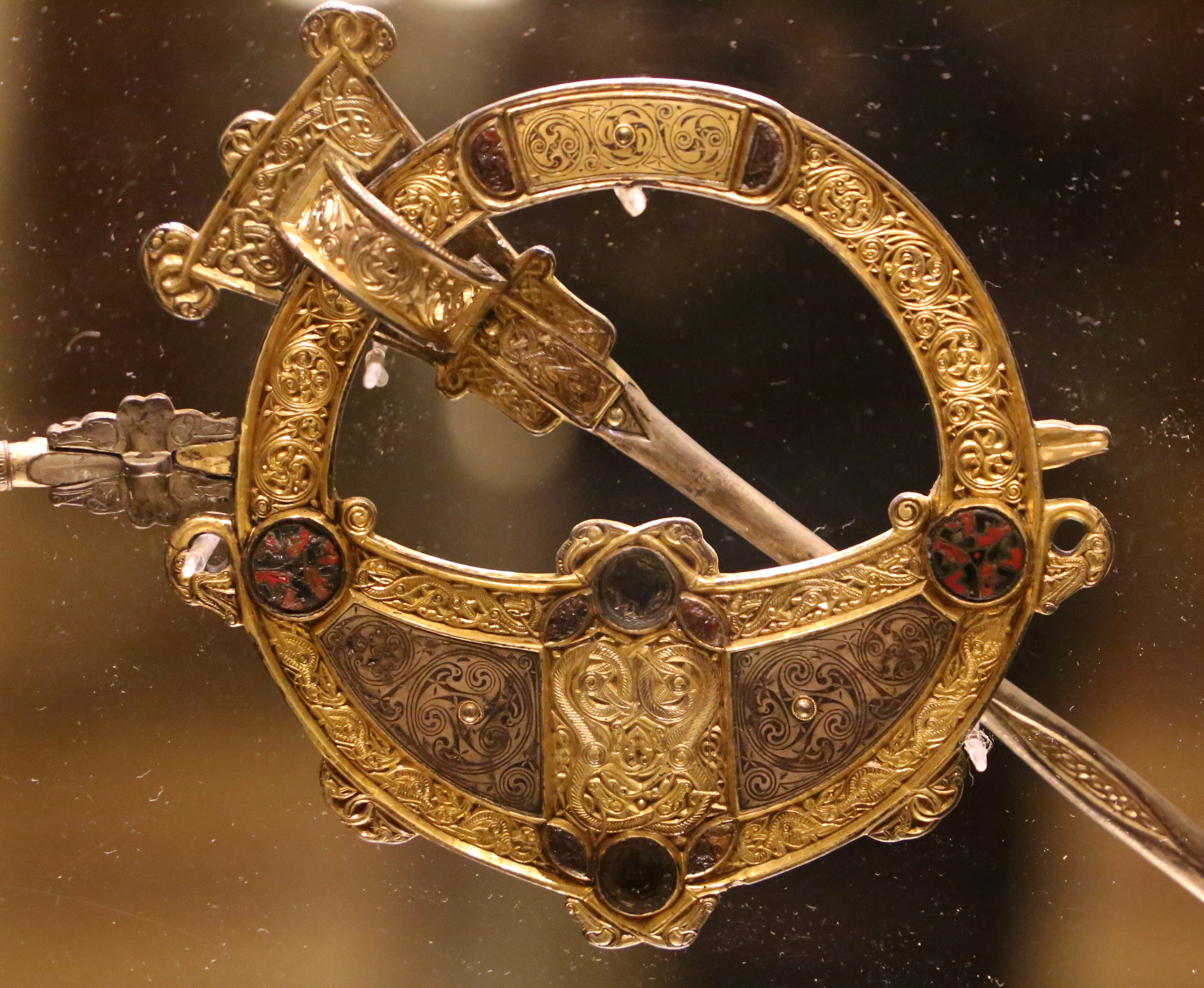
The Tara Brooch, c. 710–750

The museum holds a substantial number of ornate penannular Celtic brooches. Produced as clothes fasteners for the elites of Ireland and Scotland, they were usually worn singly at the shoulder by men and on the breast by women. Brooches are the most significant objects in high-quality secular metalwork from Early Medieval Insular art, and were later worn by the emerging middle-classes, more often by men than women. The most elaborate examples were clearly significant expressions of status at the top of society, and also worn by clergy, probably to fasten copes and other vestments rather than as everyday wear.

The Vikings began to raid Ireland from 795, with catastrophic effect for the monasteries in particular. However, although the Vikings established several longphorts, initially fortified encampments for overwintering, and later towns like Dublin, Wexford, Cork and Waterford, the native Irish were more successful than the English and Scots in preventing large-scale Viking takeovers of areas for settlement by farmers. The period is characterised by a greatly increased availability of silver, presumably the result of Viking raiding and trading, and most brooches are made from silver throughout, as gilding and decoration in other materials nearly disappears. The brooches are often large, but plainer than the most elaborate earlier ones. This continues a trend that can be detected in later brooches from the preceding period, before much Viking influence can have made itself felt.

The early 8th century Tara Brooch is the widely considered the most complex and ornate of the surviving medieval examples and has been described as the "most outstanding item of secular metalwork of the early medieval period." It has been exhibited internationally and was one of the artifacts that fuelled the Celtic Revival in the mid-19th century. The 9th century Roscrea Brooch is one of a number of transitional brooches. Later Irish brooches Scandinavian stylistic and technical influence, notably an example found on Rathlin Island.

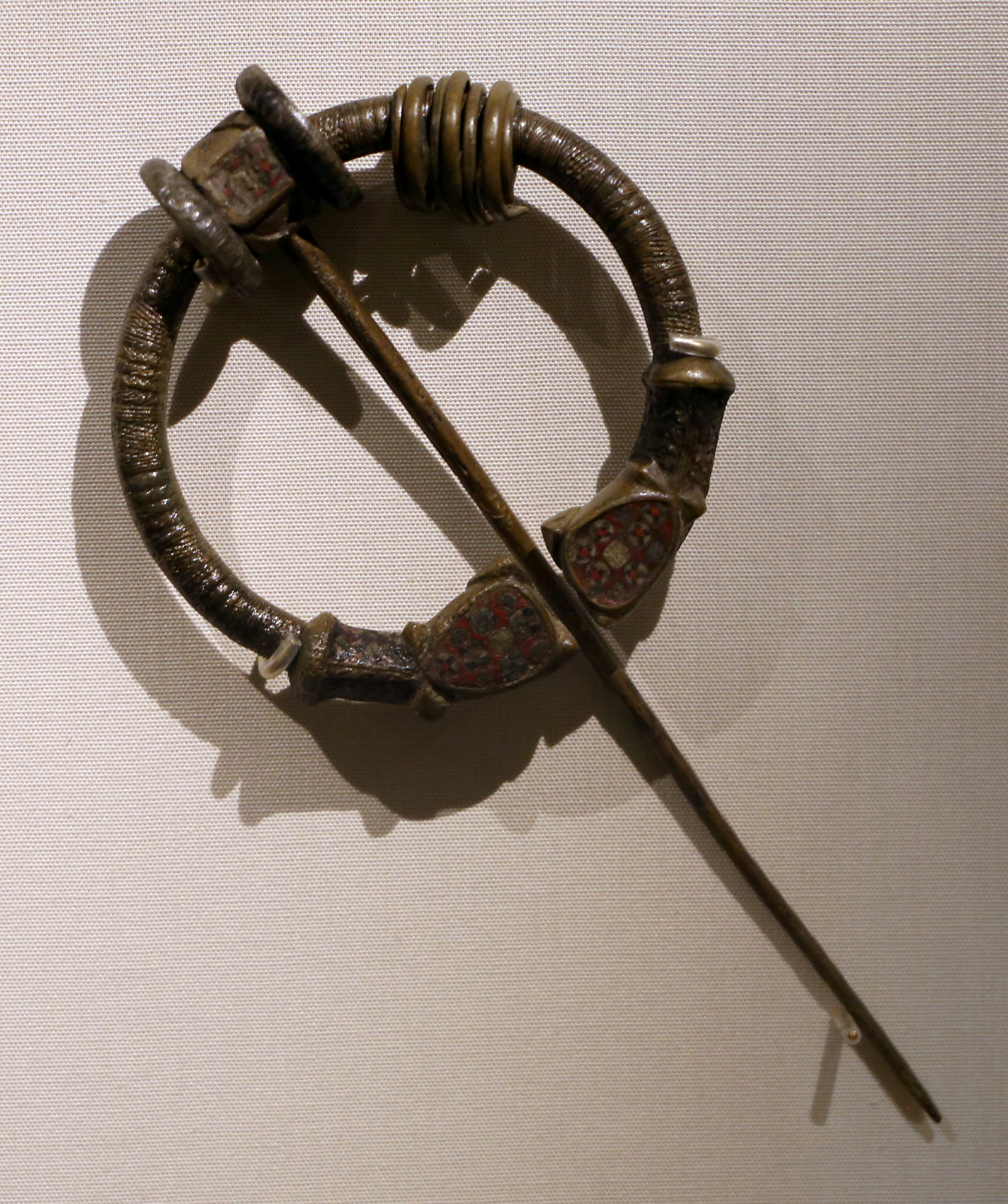
Ballinderry Brooch, c. 600, one of the most complexly designed and important of the surviving early brooches

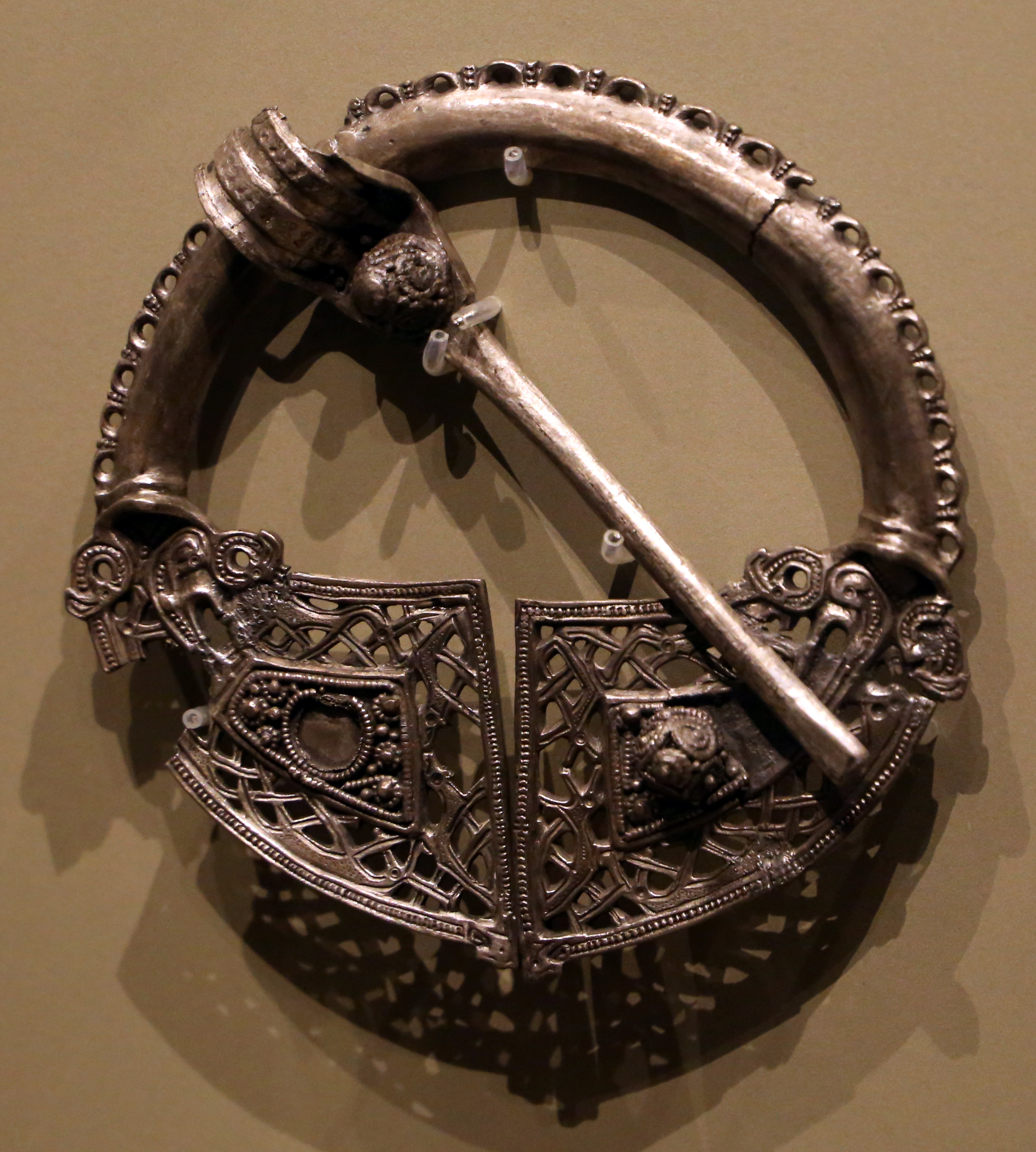
9th century silver brooch, Rathlin Island, County Antrim

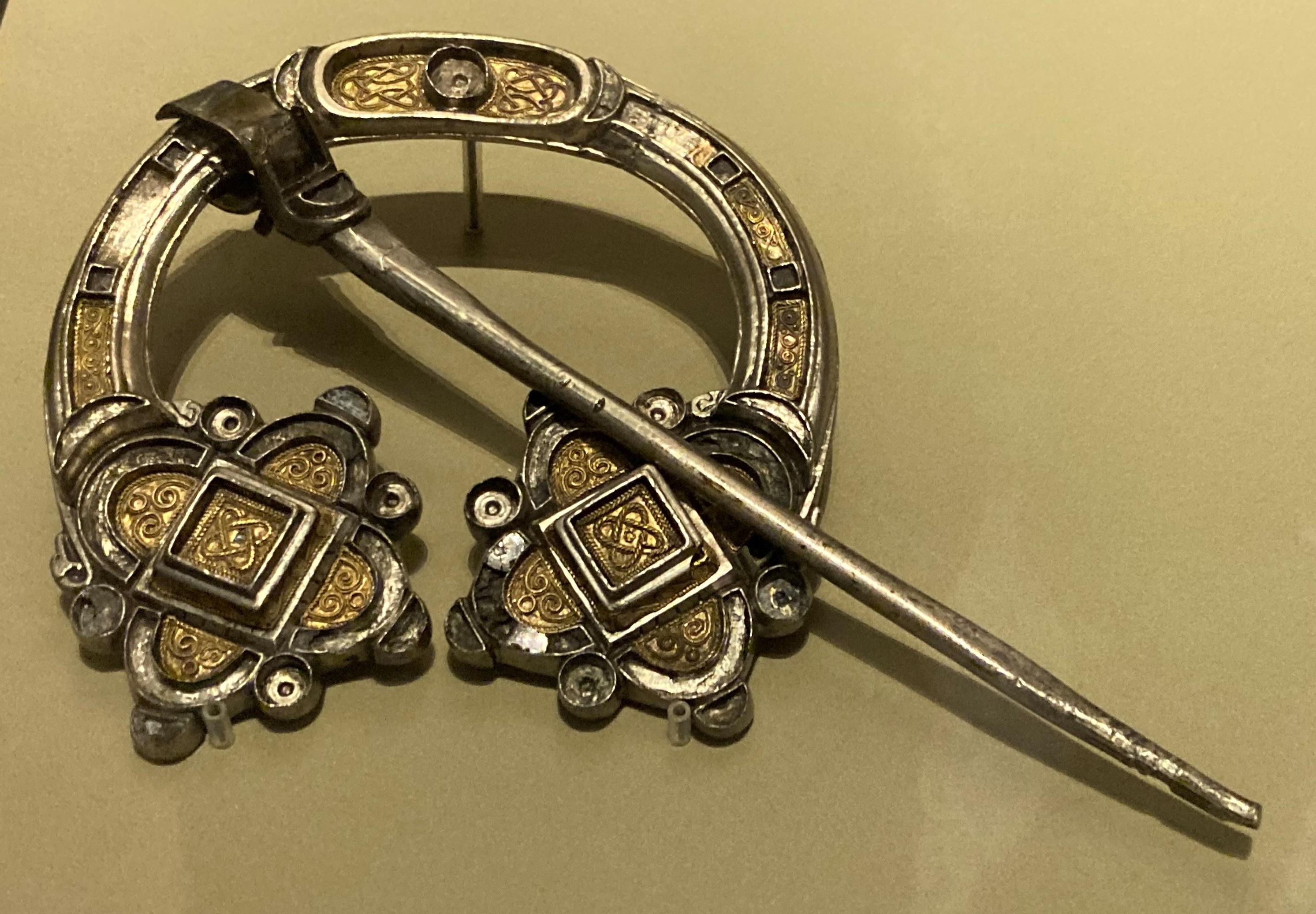
The Kilmainham Brooch, late 8th- or early 9th-century. Its design was influenced by both Pictish and Viking metalwork.

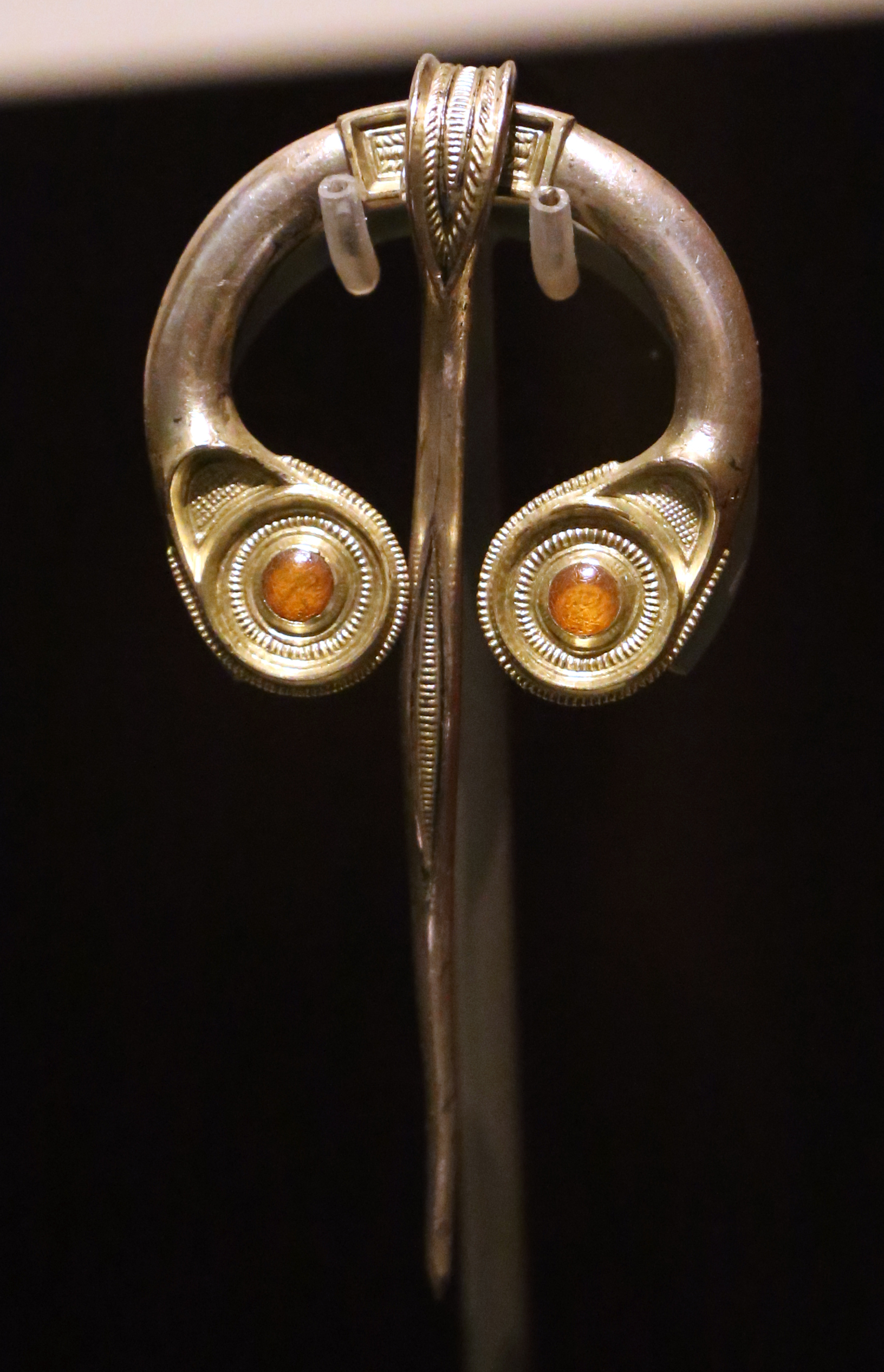
Penanular Celtic brooch, County Meath, 9th century

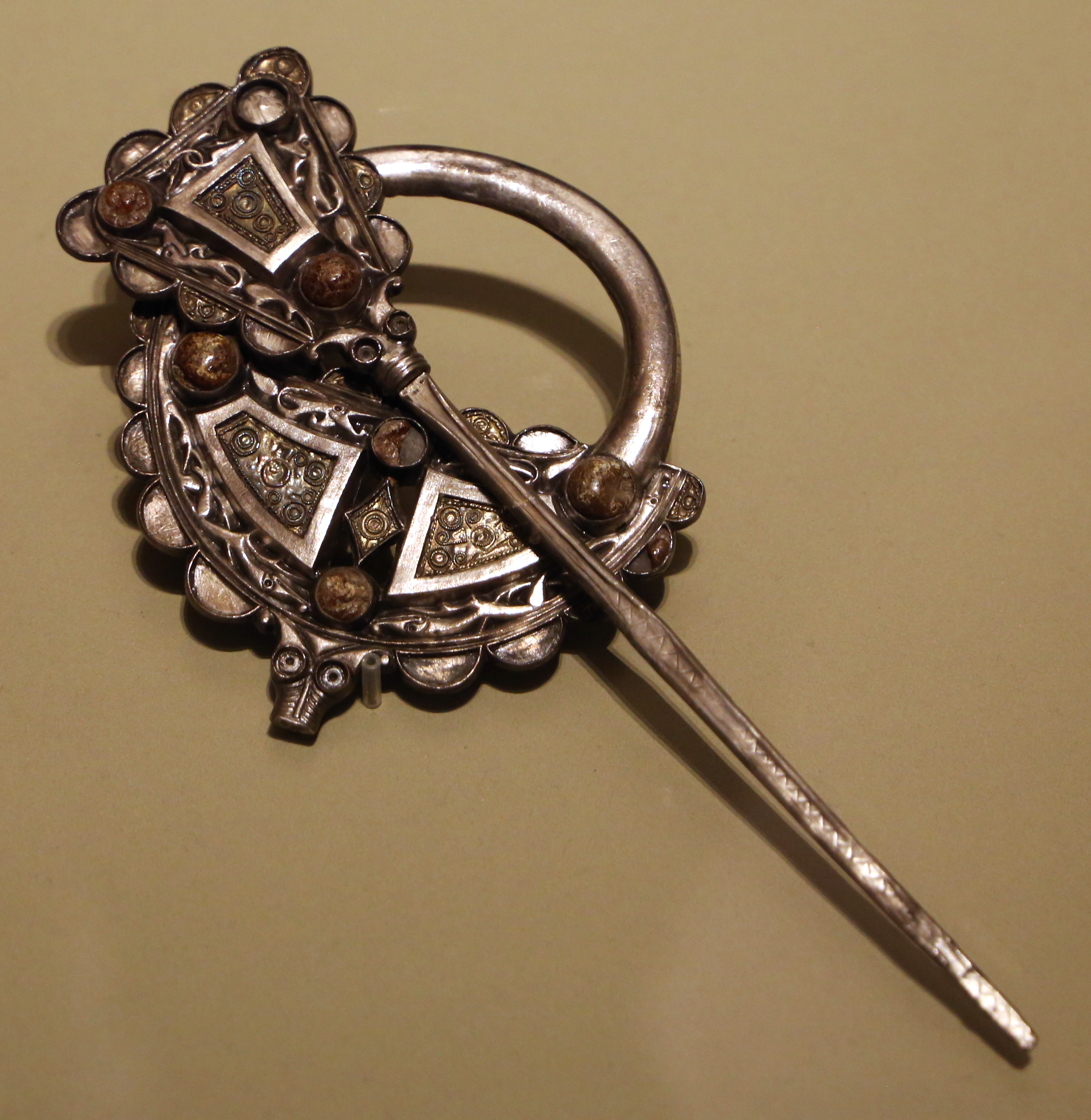
The Roscrea Brooch, 9th century

==== House-shaped shrines ====
House (or tomb) shaped shrines originate from the European continent, Ireland and Scotland and mostly date from the 8th or 9th centuries, and like many Insular shrines, they were heavily reworked and embellished in the centuries following their initial construction, often with metal adornments or figures influenced by Romanesque sculpture. Typical examples consist of a wooden core covered with silver and copper alloy plates. They were built to hold relics of saints or martyrs from the early Church era; a number held corporeal remains when found in the modern period, presumably they were parts of the saint's body. Others, including the now badly damaged Breac Maodhóg, held manuscripts associated with the commemorated saint.

The Breac Maodhóg was probably used as a battle standard when it would have been carried onto the battlefield by a cleric to offer protection to the troops and perhaps bring victory. A medieval text on the patron saints of the kings of Leinster records that the kings of Breifne sought that "the famous wonder-working Breac [was] carried thrice around them" during battle.

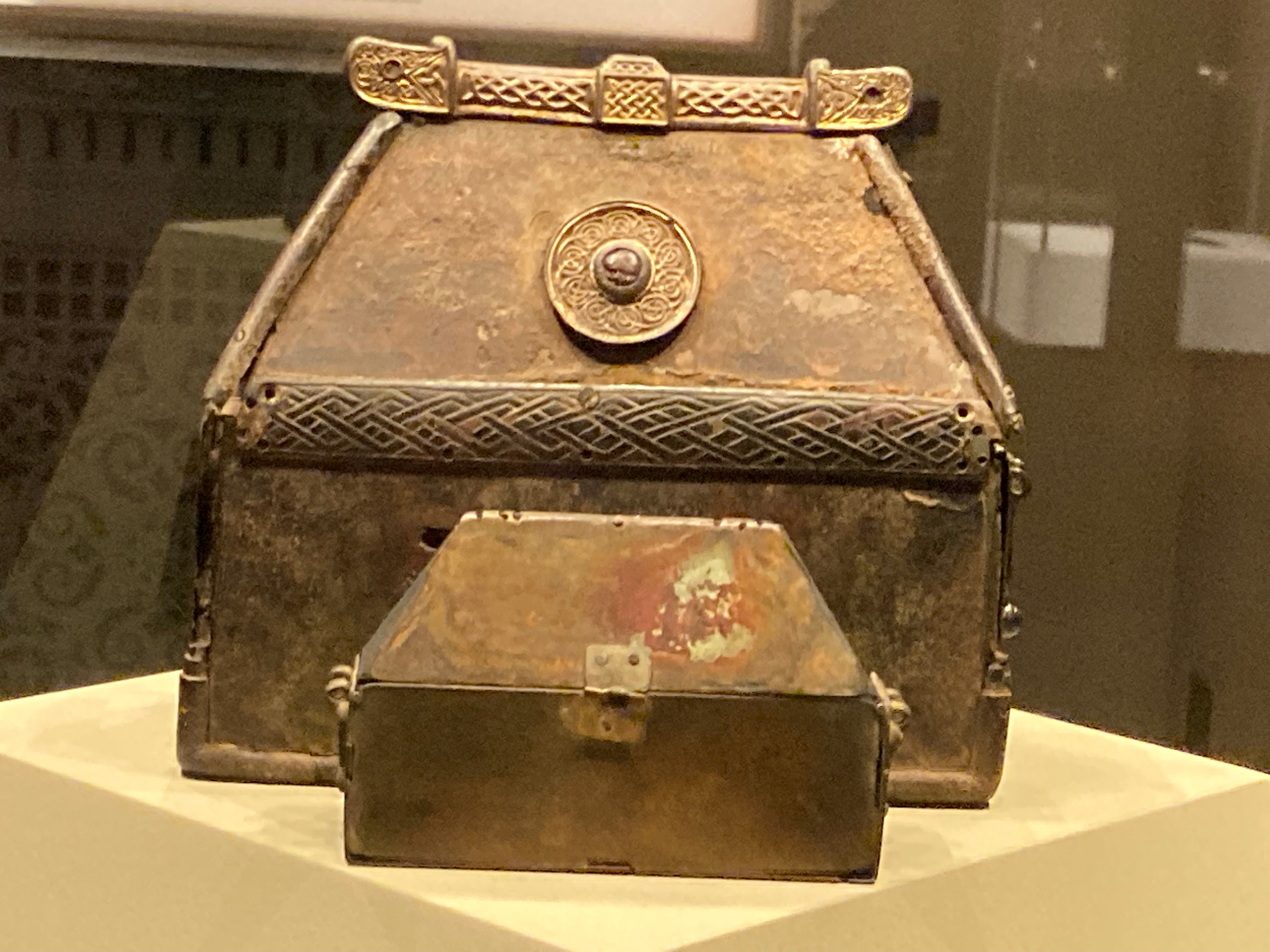
The Lough Erne Shrines, 8th or 9th-centuries. The smaller but similar shrine was found inside the larger container.

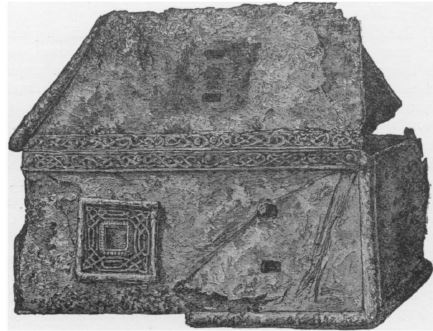
Drawing of a shrine found in the River Shannon, c. 9th century

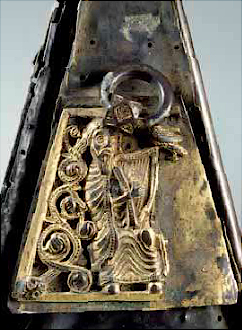
Gable of the badly damaged but important Breac Maodhóg, showing the figure of a harpist. Late 11th century

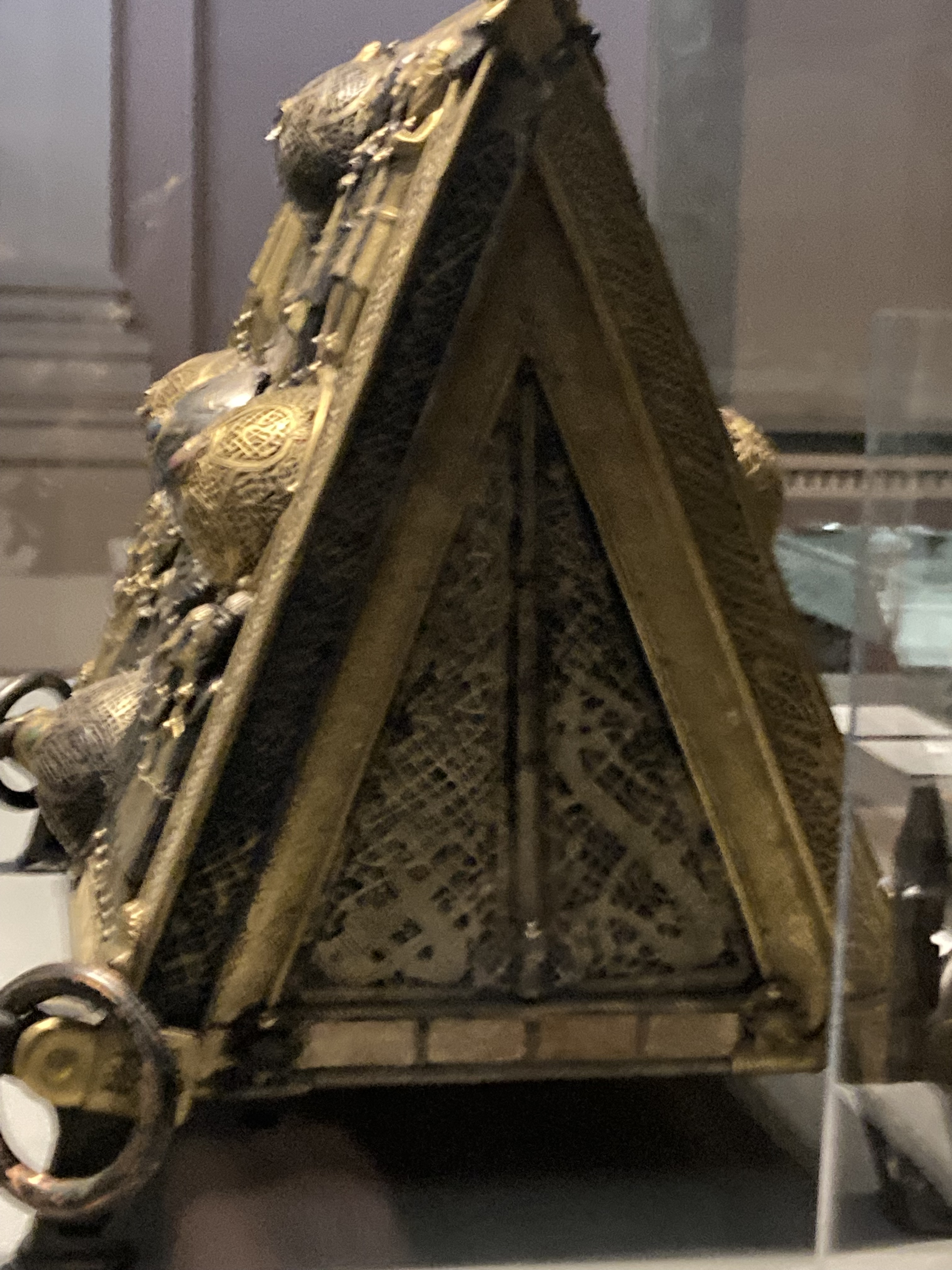
Saint Manchan's Shrine, 12th century

==== Cumdachs ====
Cumdachs (or book shrines) are elaborate ornamented metal reliquary boxes or cases used to hold Early Medieval Irish manuscripts or relics. They are typically later than the books they contain, often by several centuries. In most surviving examples the book comes from the peak age of Irish monasticism before 800, and the extant cumdachs date from after 1000, although it is clear the form dates from considerably earlier. The usual form is a design based on a cross on the main face, with use of large gems of rock crystal or other semi-precious stones, leaving the spaces between the arms of the cross for more varied decoration. Several were carried on a metal chain or leather cord, often worn off the belt, or suspended around the neck, placing them next to the heart and thus offering spiritual and perhaps medical benefits. They were also used to bring healing to the sick or dying, or more formally, as witness contracts. Many had hereditary laykeepers from among the chiefly families who had formed links with monasteries.

Although most of the extant book-shaped protective shrines are mentioned in Irish annals, they were not properly described until the early 19th century, when antiquarians and collectors such as Petrie began to seek them out from heredity collections. Most are badly damaged, including due to general wear and tear over the centuries, fires at their holding location, or more usually, having elements such as their gemstones removed for sale by their owners. A majority are now in the NMI.

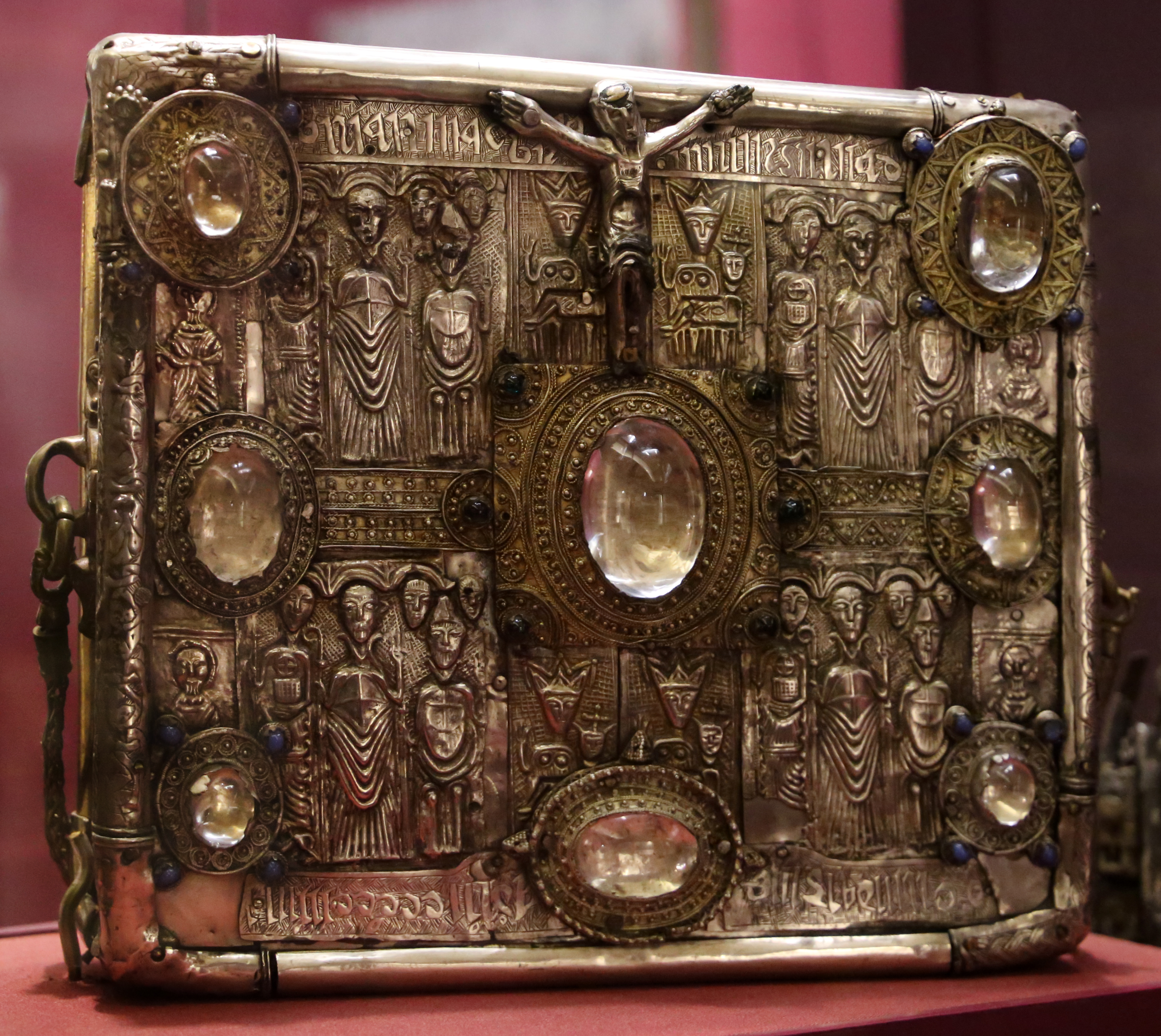
Shrine of Miosach, 11th century. May have once contained a manuscript with psalms or extracts from a Gospel

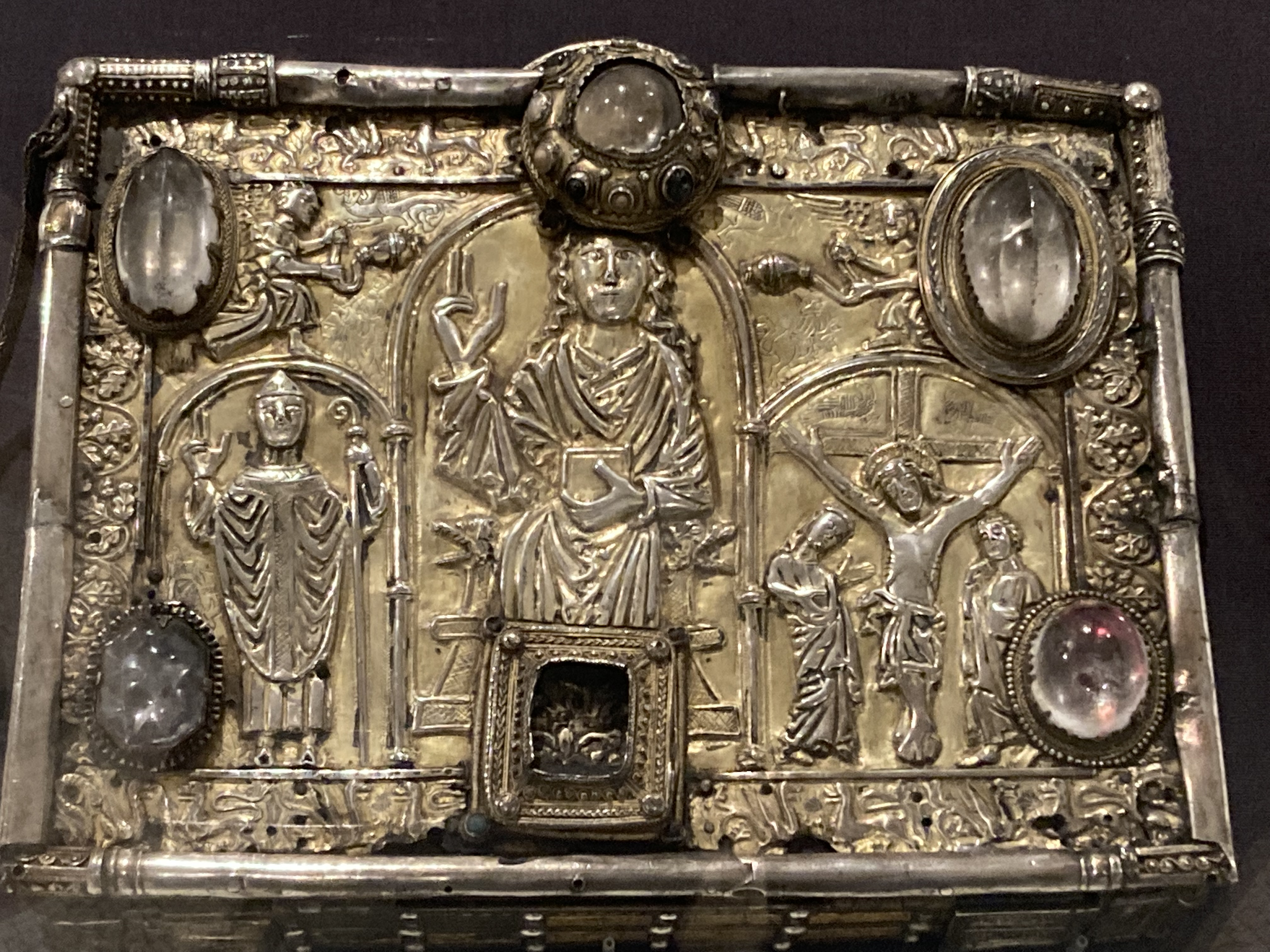
The Shrine of the Cathach of St. Columba, 11th century

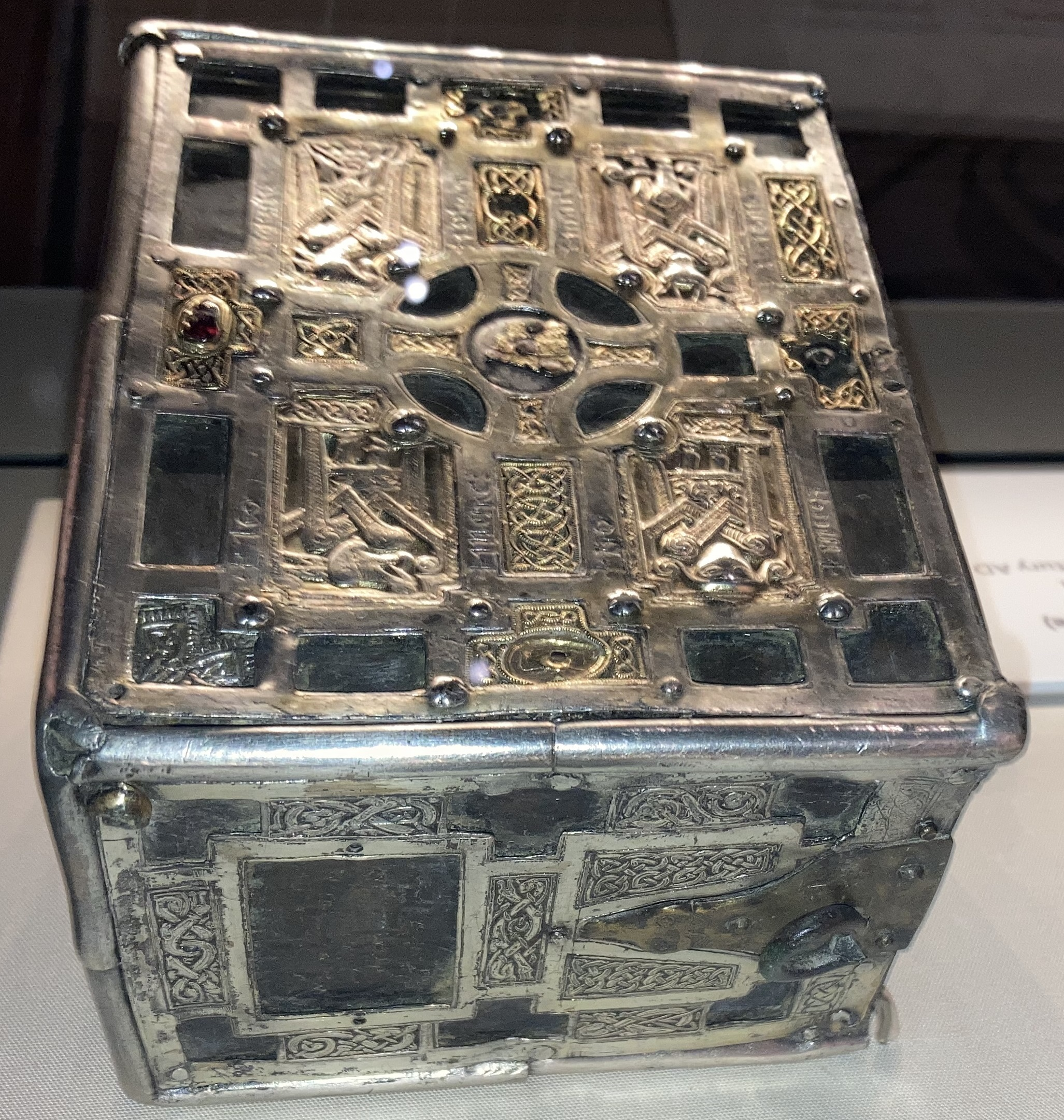
The 11th century Soiscél Molaisse

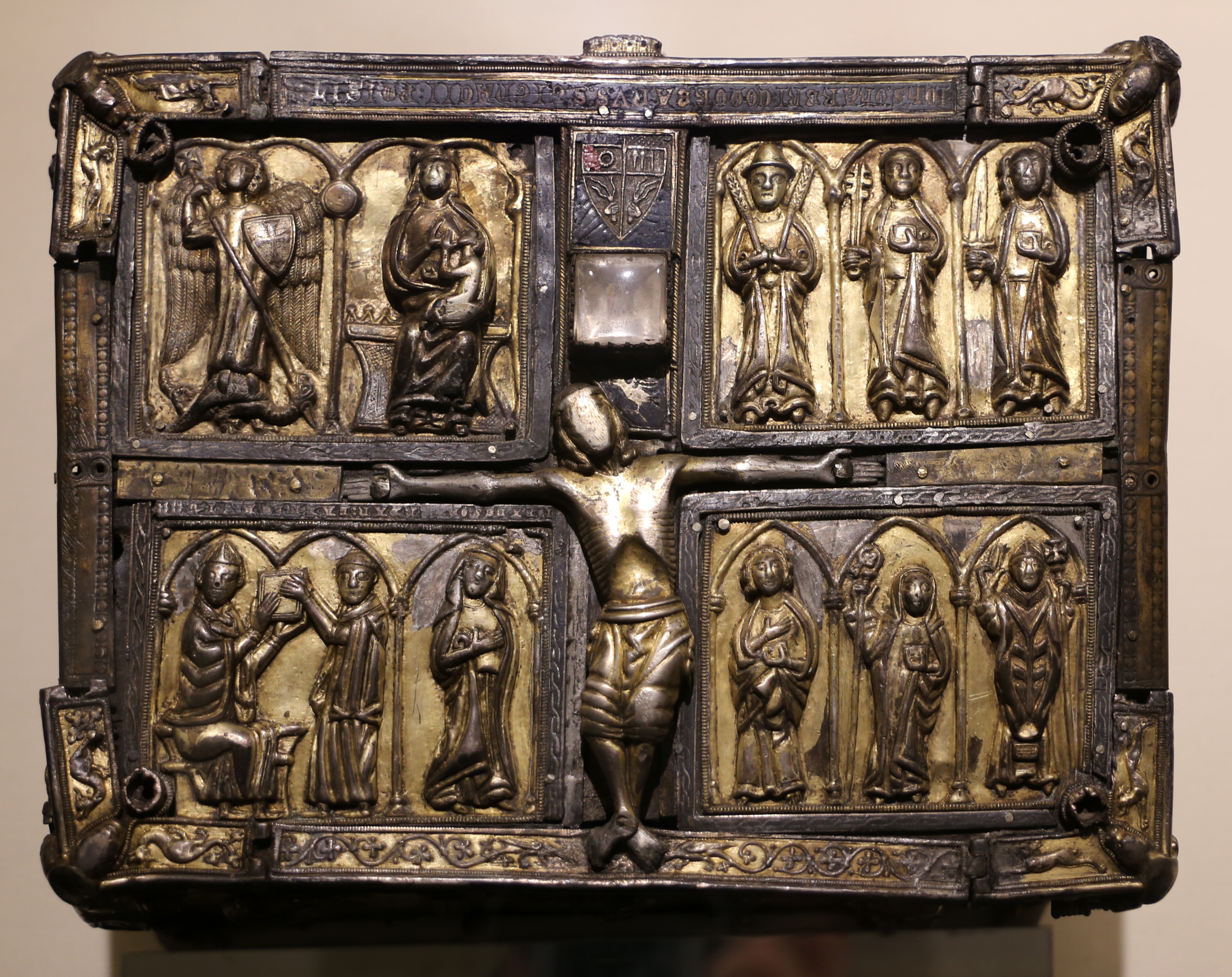
Panel from the Domnach Airgid, an 8th-century wooden reliquary reworked between the 13th and 15th centuries.

==== Croziers ====
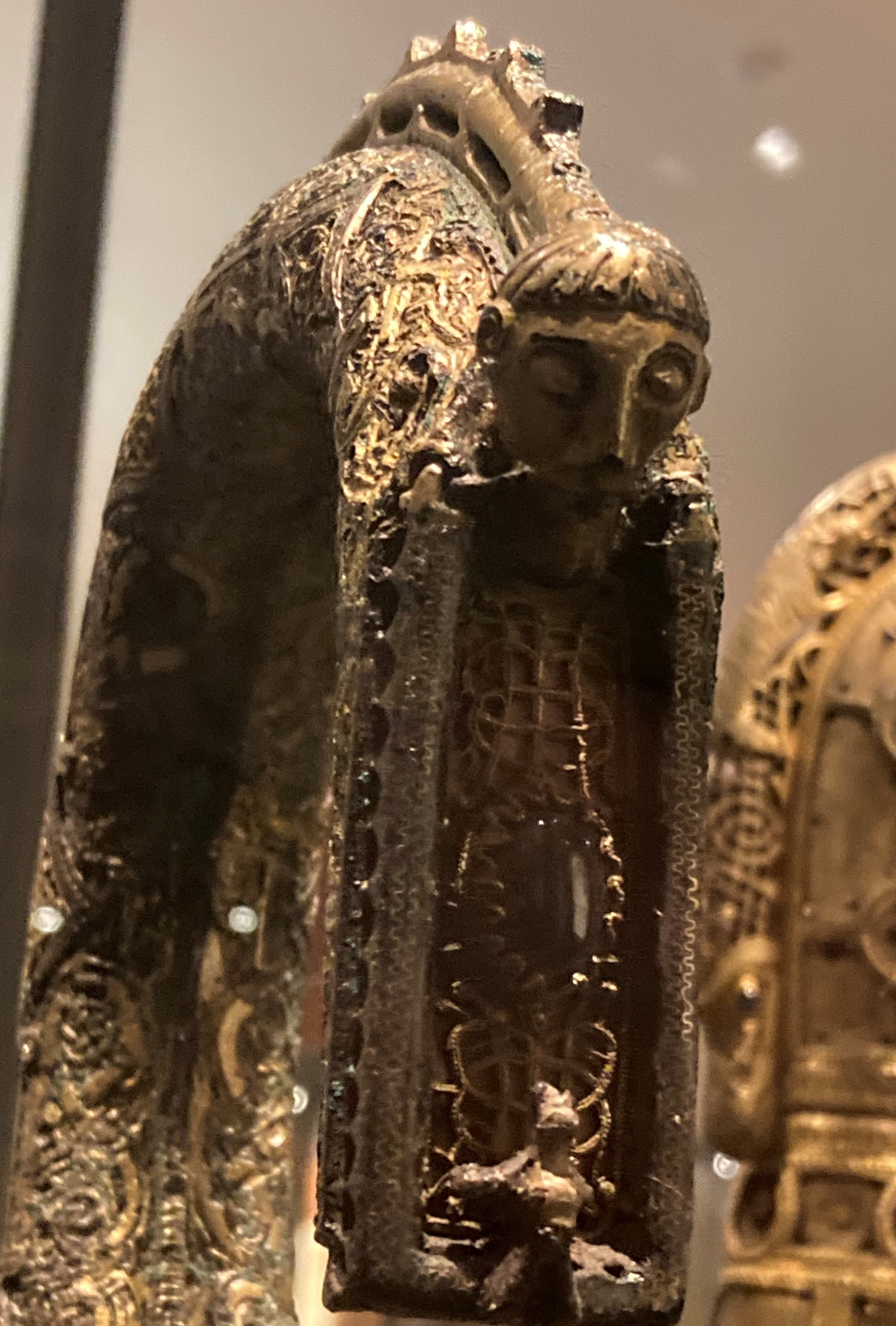
Drop-plate of the River Laune Crozier, late 11th century

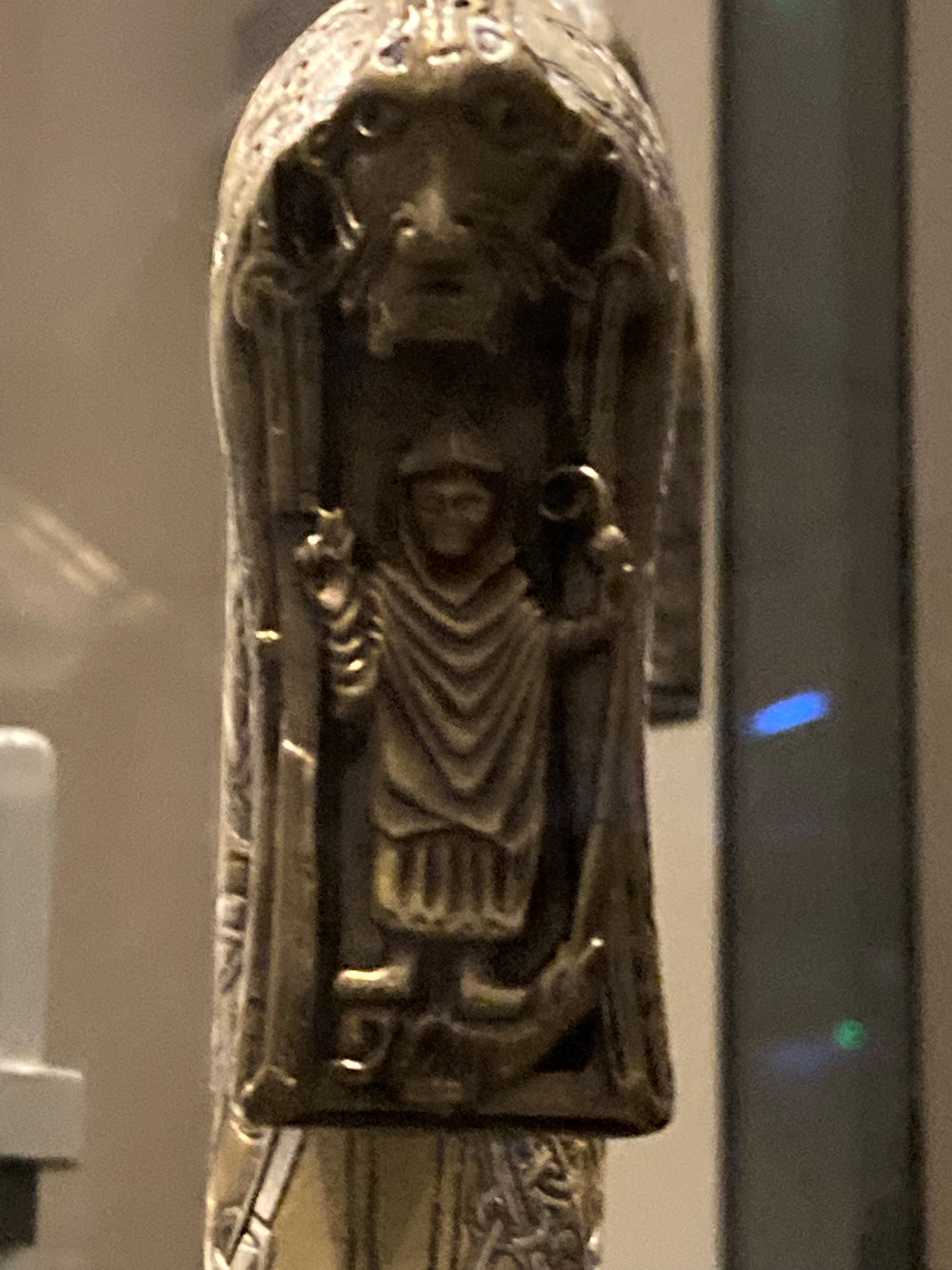
Drop-plate of the Clonmacnoise Crozier

The NMI holds the vast majority of extant Insular croziers. There are types of processional bishop's staff (crozier) produced in Ireland and Scotland between c. 800 and 1200. They can be distinguished from mainland European types by their curved crooks and drop (the hollow box-like extension at the end of the crook). Symbols of office for bishops or abbots, their form is based on the idea of the clerics as shepherds for their flocks. Although their production ended c. 1200, they continued in use and were often refurbished and added to until the late medieval period. After the dissolution of the monasteries in the 12th and 13th centuries, the croziers were in danger of plunder from both Viking and Norman invaders. As large objects, they were difficult to hide, a reason why so many surviving examples show evidence of having been broken in two; reducing their length made them easier to hide in small spaces. A majority of the surviving extant croziers or fragments were held over the centuries by hereditary keepers (usually generations of a local family) until they were re-discovered by antiquarians in the early 19th century.

The croziers are often ornamented with interlace designs, geometric patterns and zoomorphic (portraying humans as non-human animals) figures. The animal designs in the earliest example, including the 9th century Prosperous Crozier, are depicted in a naturalistic manner, while many of the later examples, such as the c. 1100 Lismore Crozier, bear influence from both the Ringerike and Urnes styles of Viking art. Some of the Ringerike style animals bear close resemblance to figures on the margins of ninth-century Celtic brooches. In craftmanship and ornamentation, the late 11th century Clonmacnoise Crozier is considered the finest of the fully intact example, followed in quality by the 11th century River Laune and Lismore Crozier.

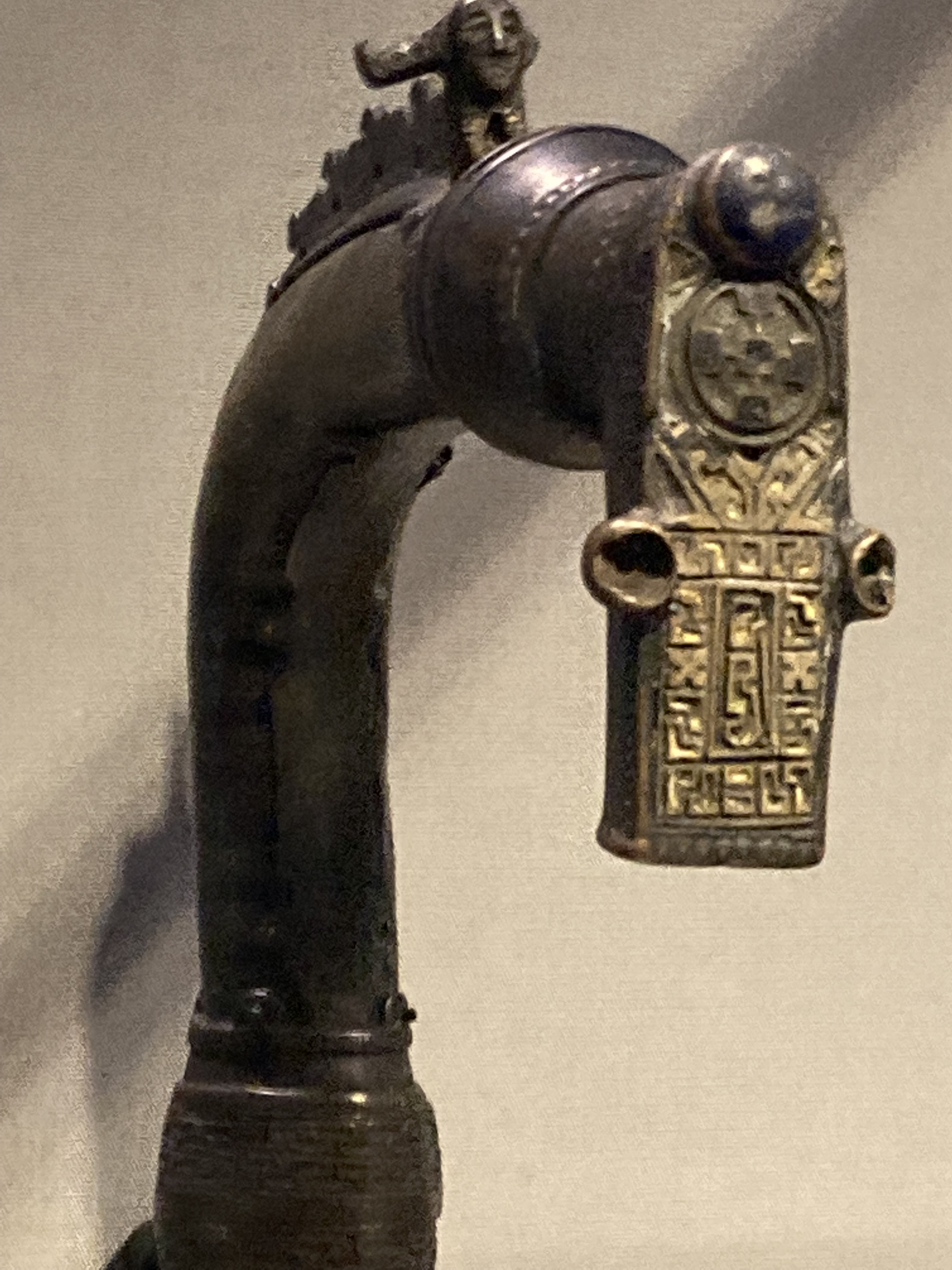
Prosperous Crozier, late 10th or early 11th century

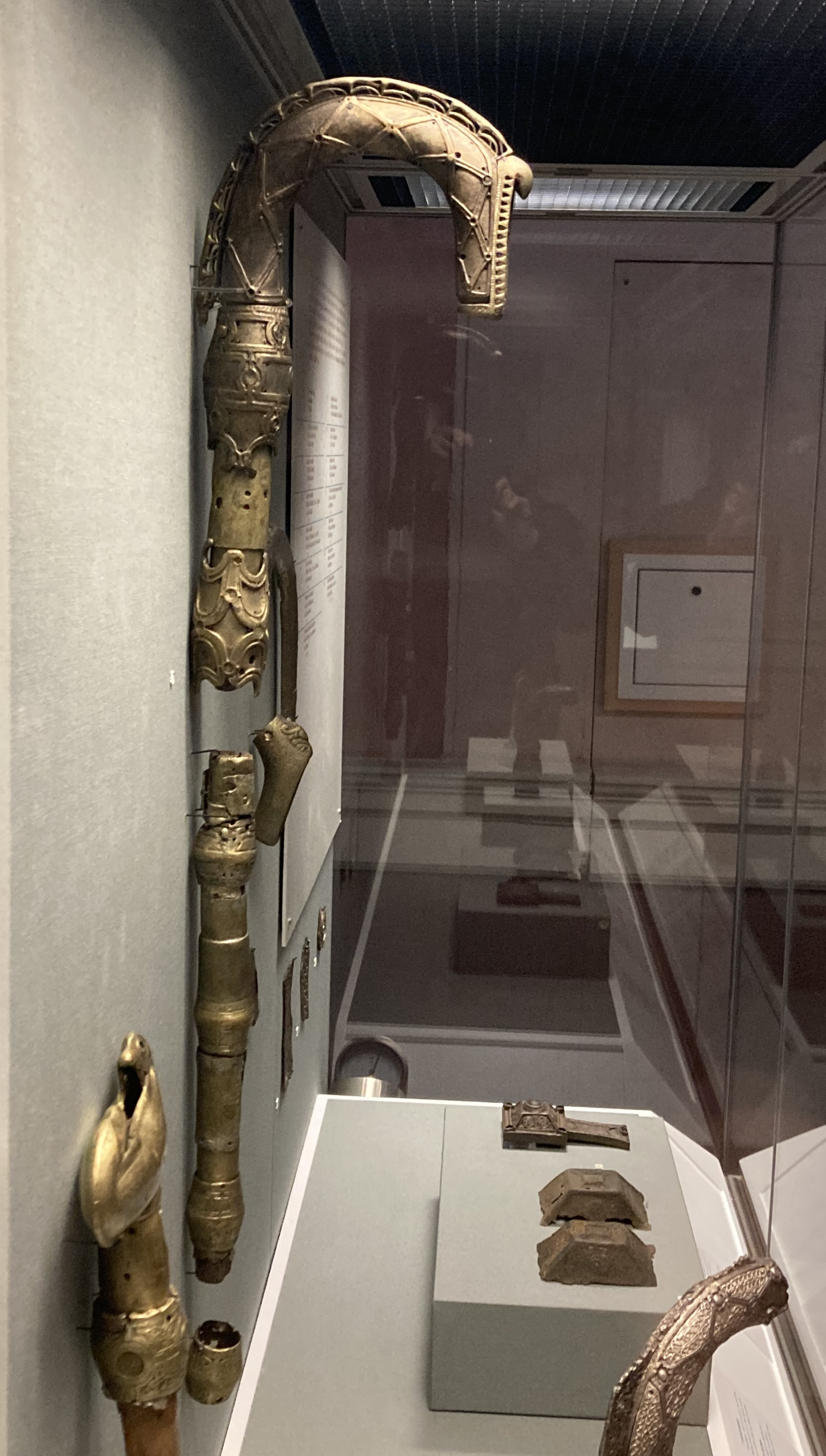
Crozier of Dysert O'Dea (or St. Tola's Crozier), 11th century

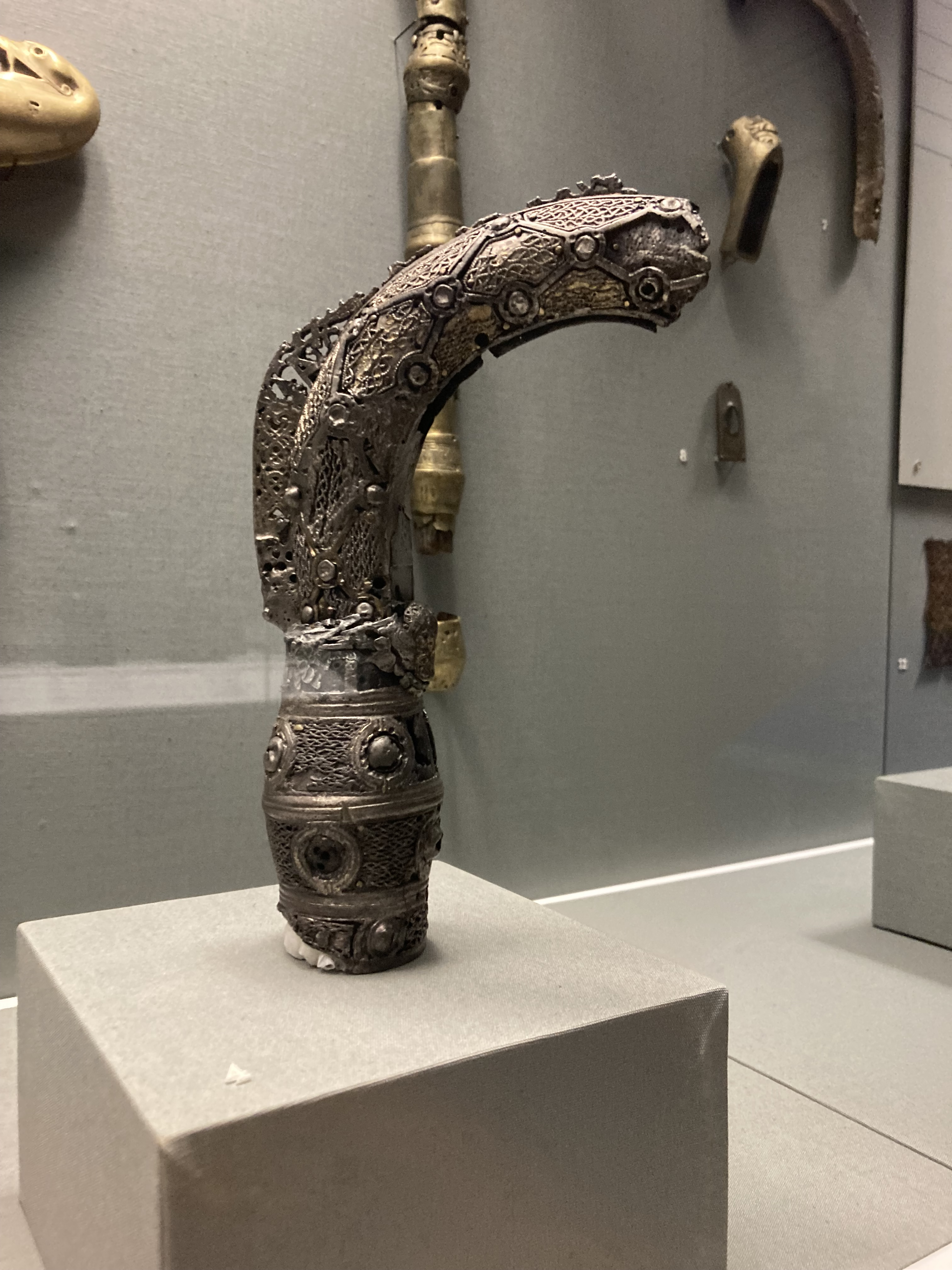
Crozier head (fragment)

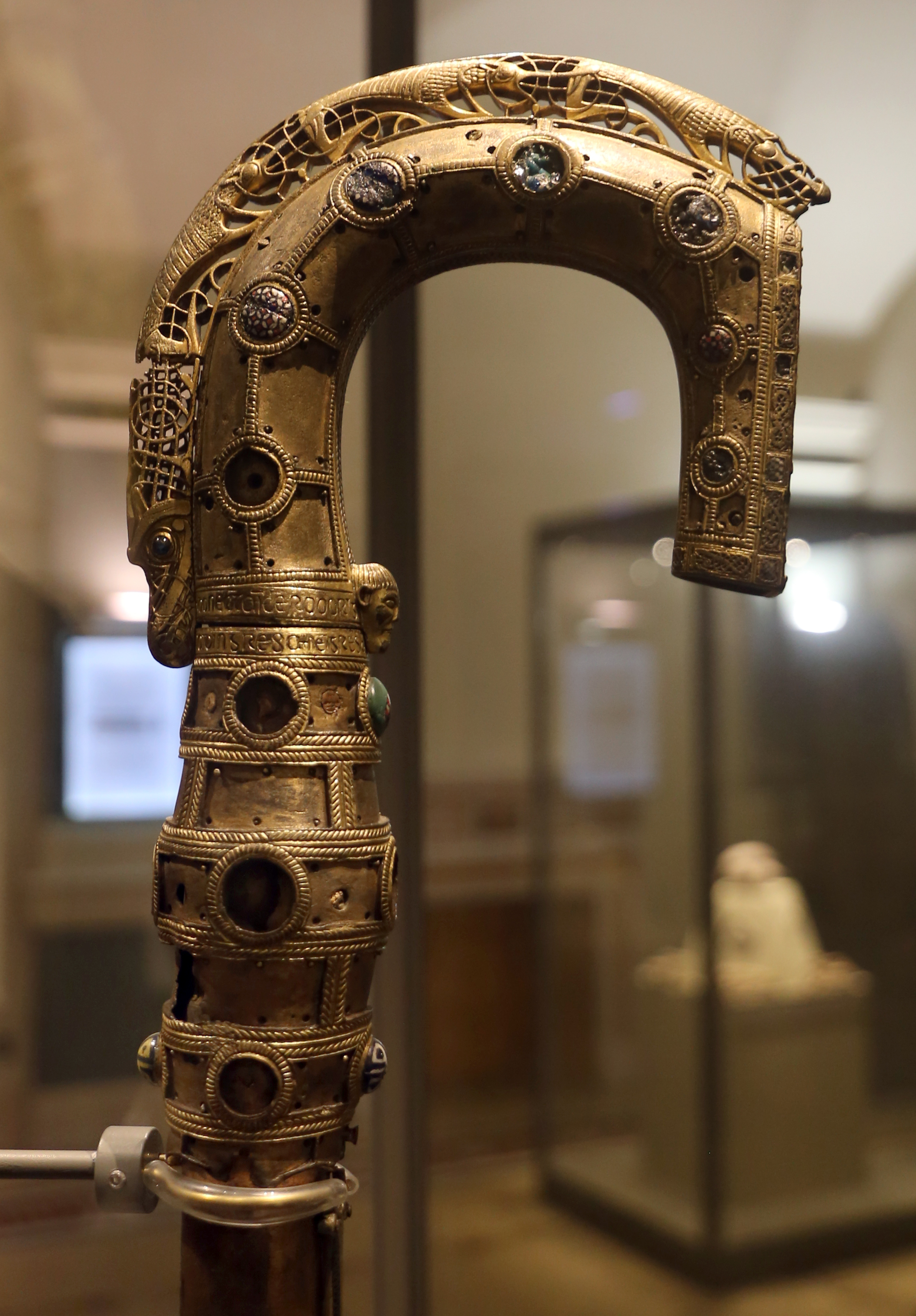
Lismore Crozier, c 1100

=== Late Medieval ===
Over the course of the 12th century, the Viking port cities of Dublin, Waterford and Cork developed extensive trade links with Britain and the continent. This led to greater exposure to international styles and inevitably began the end of the Insular period of Irish art. The earlier style largely came to an end after the mid-12th century Church reform movement, the Norman invasion of 1169–1170 and the subsequent wide adoption of Romanesque art. According to Kelly, by the late Middle Ages, "much of the material on display [in the museum] illustrates lifestyles, trades and activities that were common to much of medieval Europe". This, through the Gothic and Renaissance periods Irish art was essentially a regional variation of wider European styles.

The English colonisation of Ireland resulted in the island having two separate identities through the last Middle Ages, each with their own language, laws and cultures, a fact that can be discerned from contemporary objects in the museum's collection. The museum defines the late period as extending from c. 1150 to c. 1550, but allows for a lot of cross-over with the earlier "golden age" of Irish art (including some of the later croziers, bell-shrines and cumdachs).

The museum displays its collection of later work under three groupings: "bellatores (those who fight), oratores (those who pray) and laboratores (those who work)".

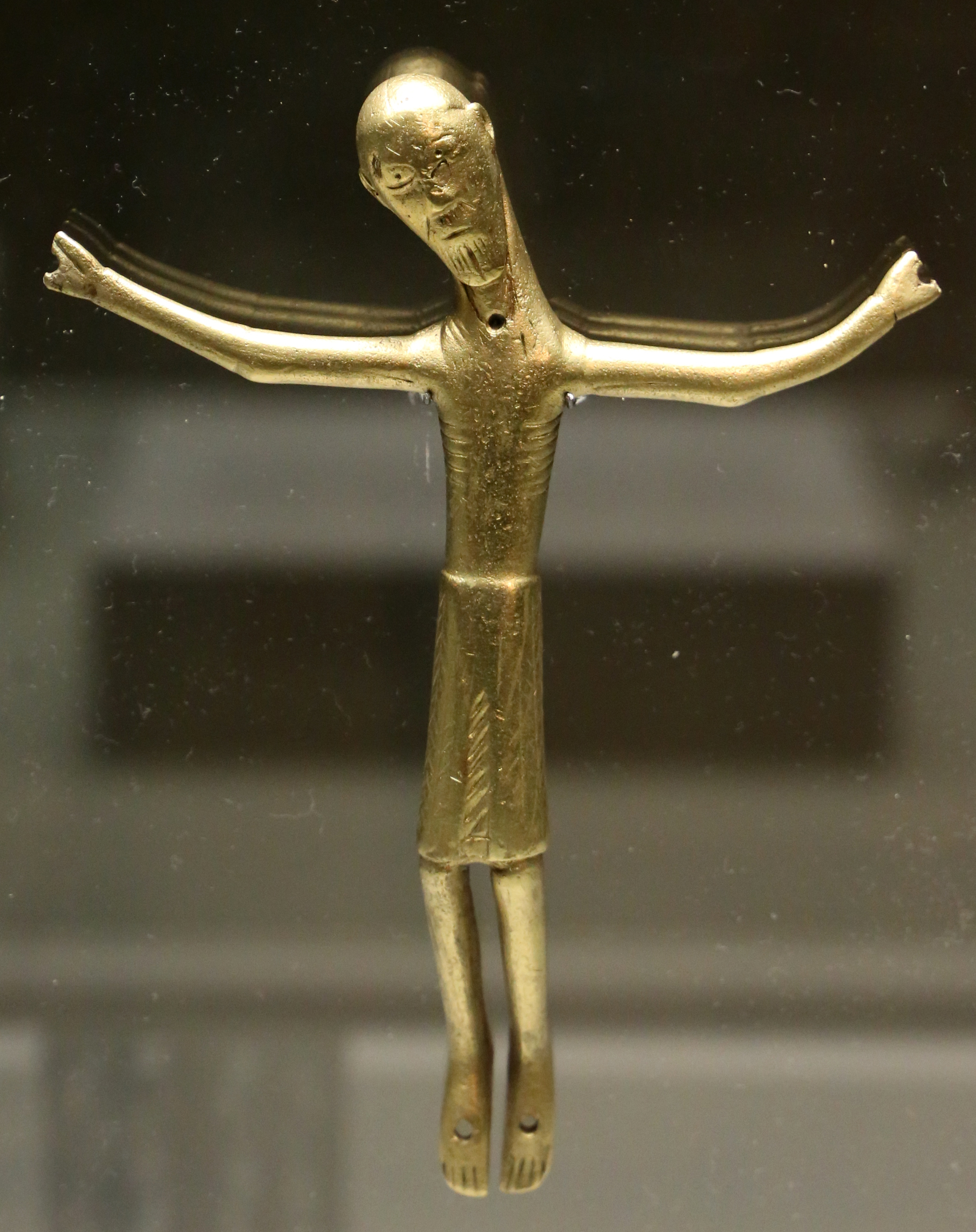
Copper-alloy crucifix figurine, County Wicklow, 12th century

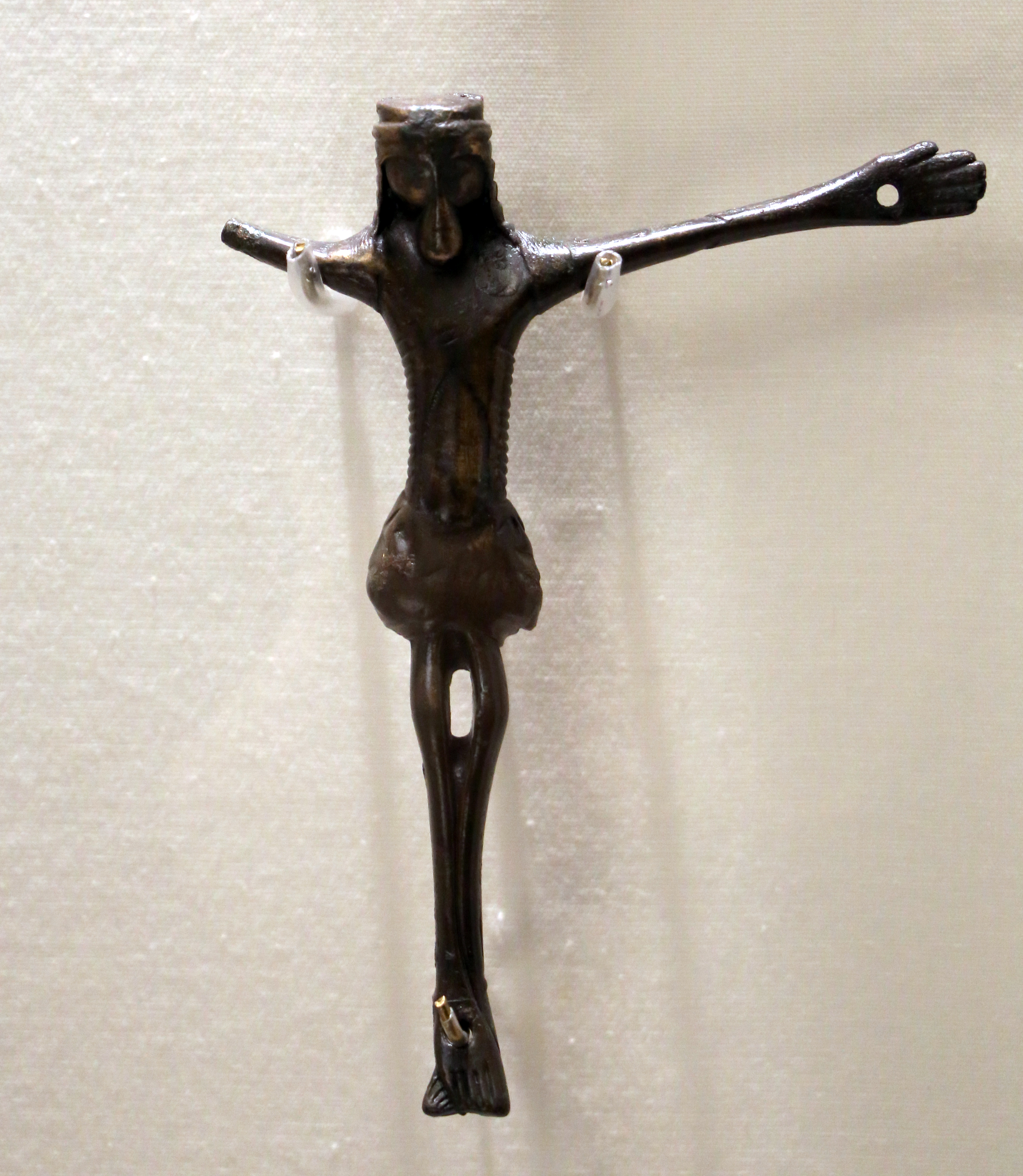
Crucifix in gilded copper-alloy, c. 1470

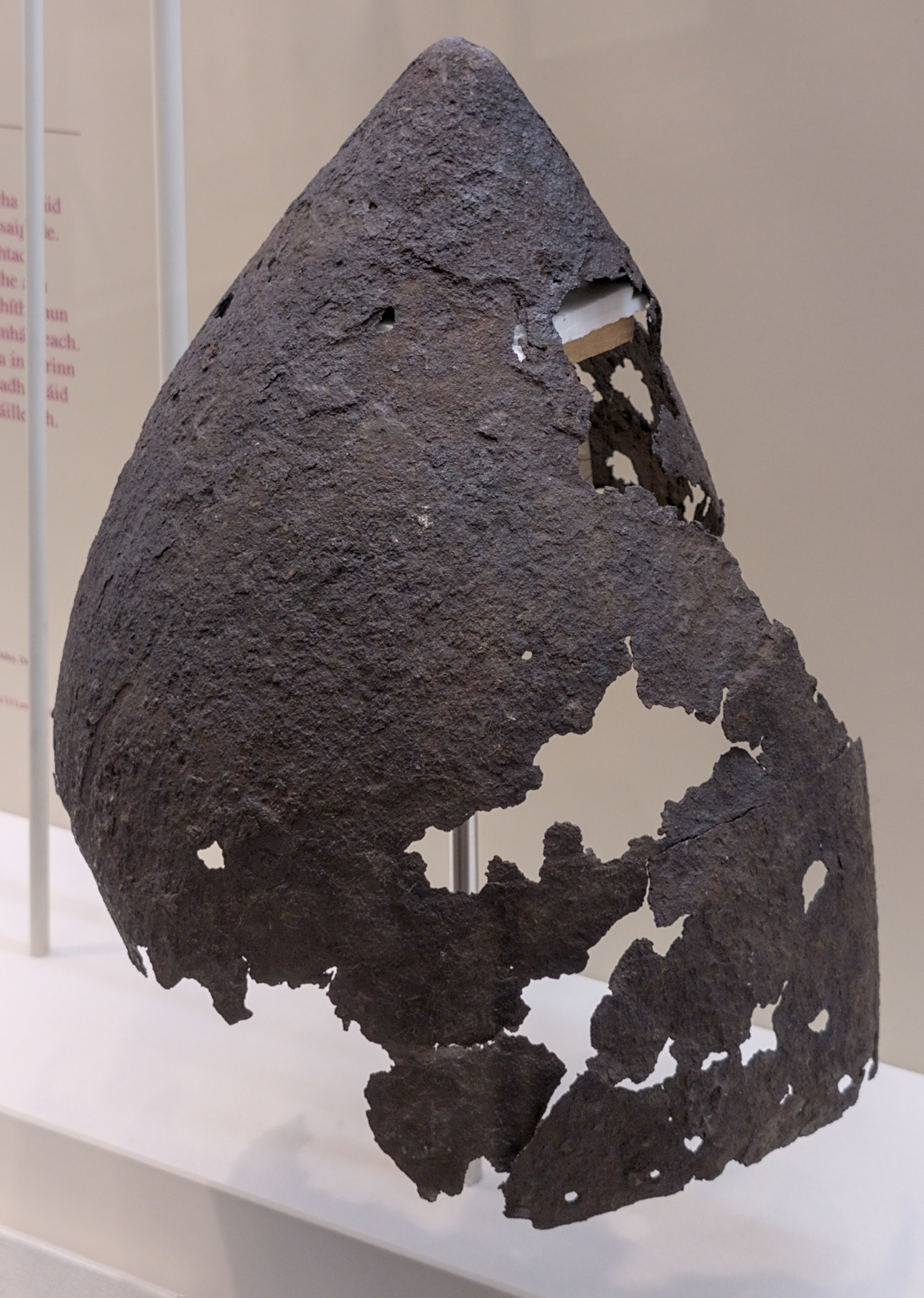
Remains of a bascinet made of iron, 14th–15th century. Found in Clashnamuck, County Laois.

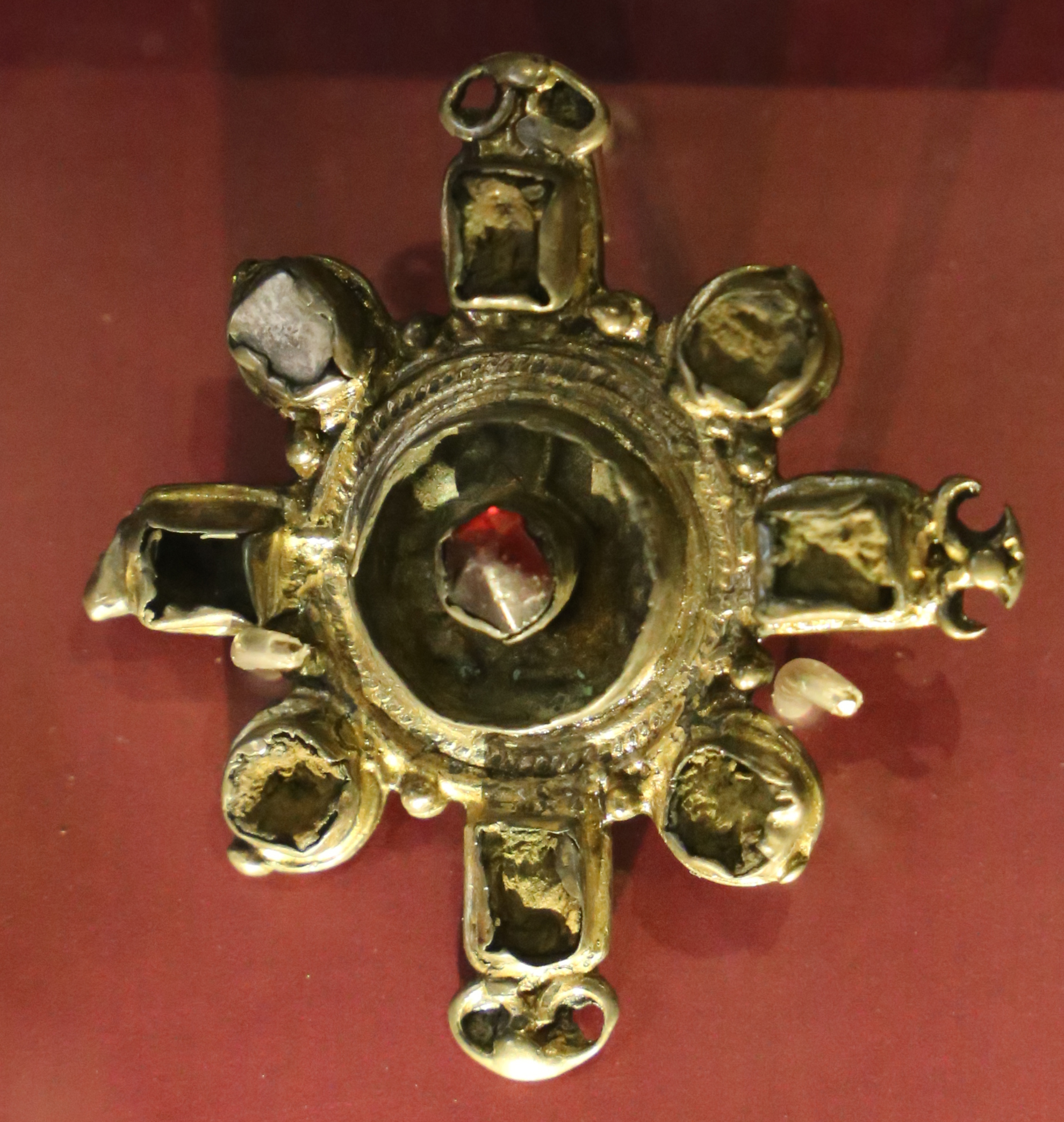
Gilded silver cross pendant, c. 1500

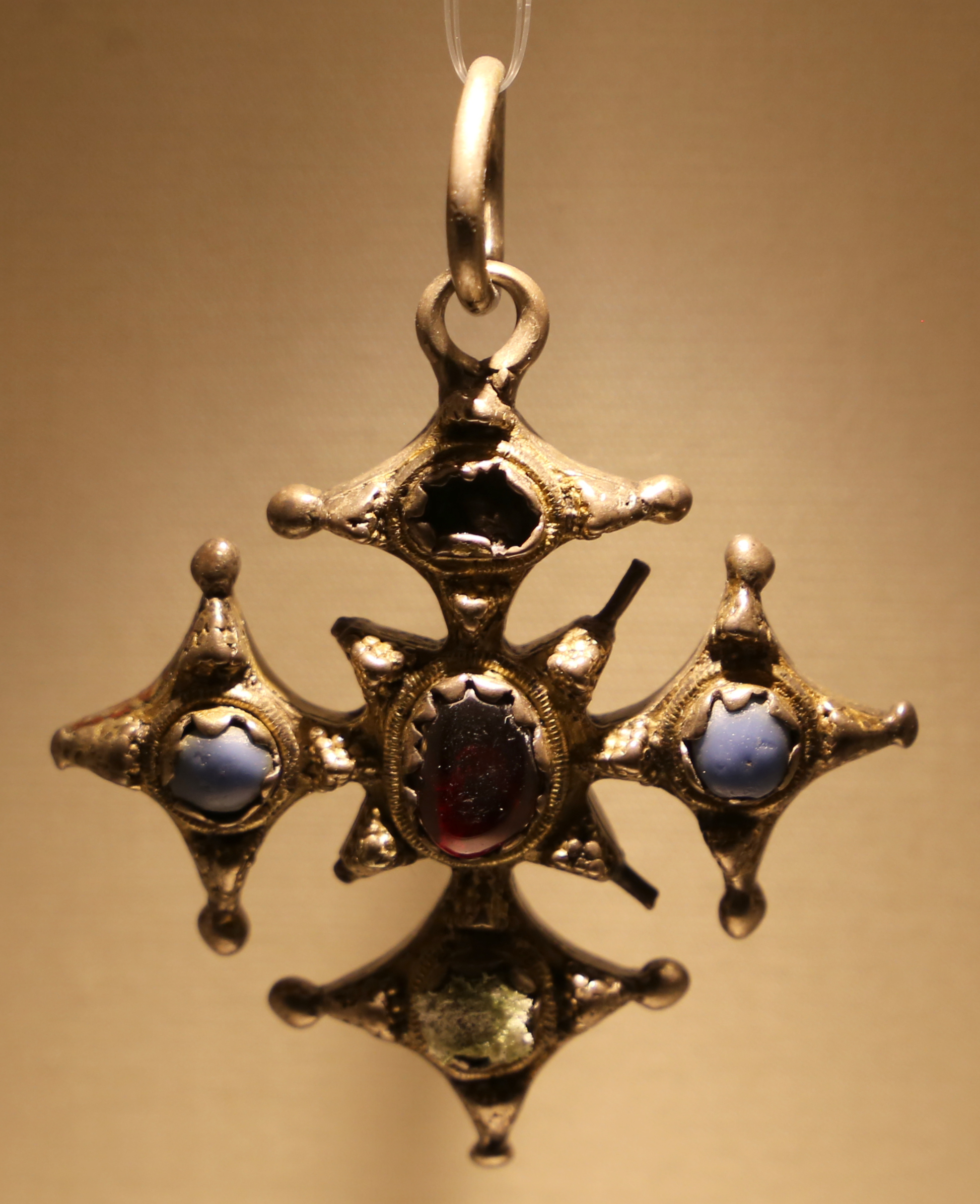
Silver cross pendant with glass and garnets, c. 1500. Found near Callan, County Kilkenny

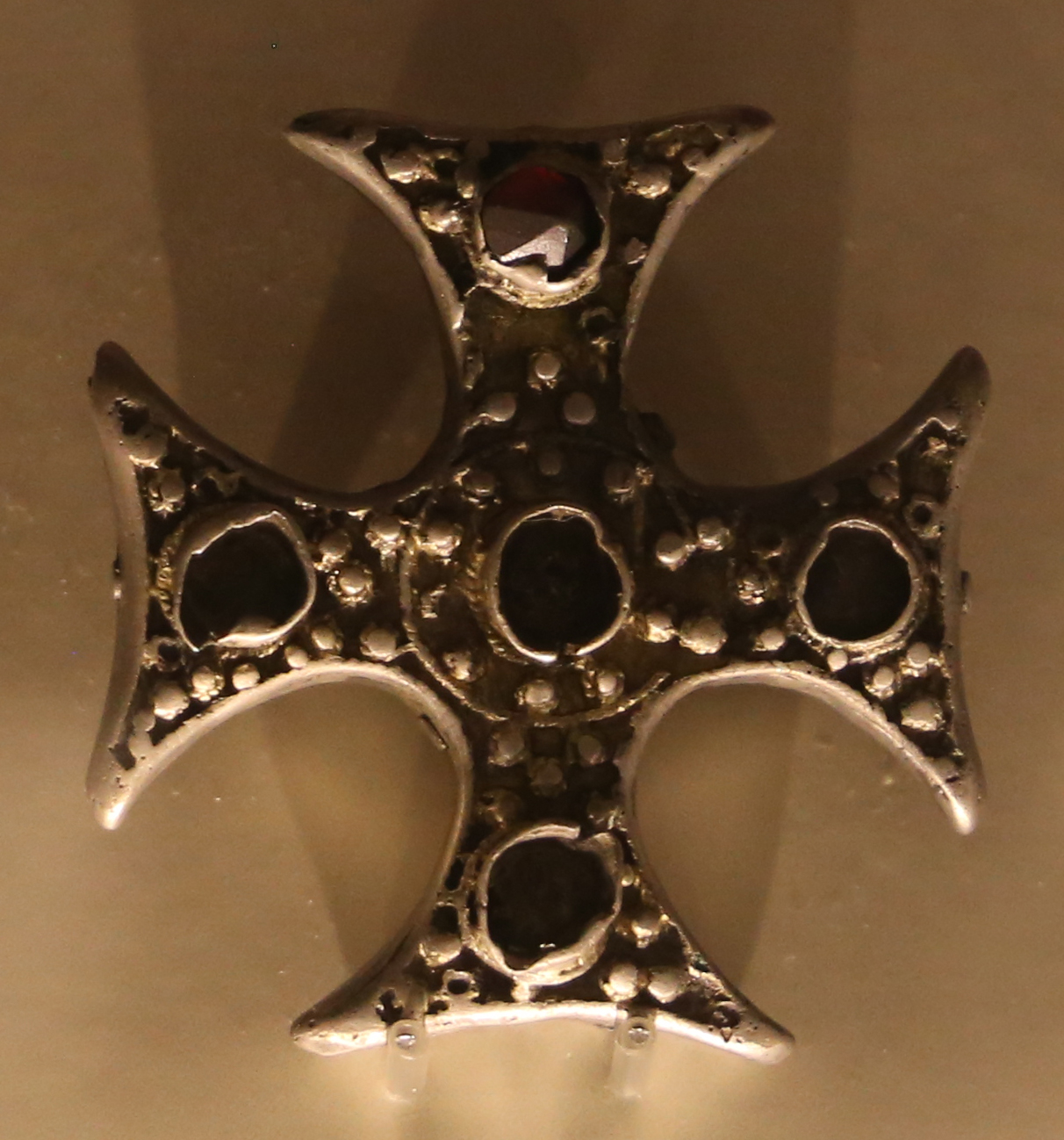
Pendant with crucifix, gilded silver, c. 1500, County Waterford

== Governance ==
The museum's stated function is to hold the nation's "archaeological, ethnographical, classical and Egyptian collections. The Division is also responsible for the administration of various statutory functions such as the acquisition of archaeological objects claimed as the property of the State and the regulation of licences to export and alter archaeological objects". Its day-to-day work is preoccupied with recording and cataloging newly found artefacts, which in 2019 mostly involved bog finds, lithics and ceramics.
