= Londesborough Brooch =

Early medieval Celtic artifact

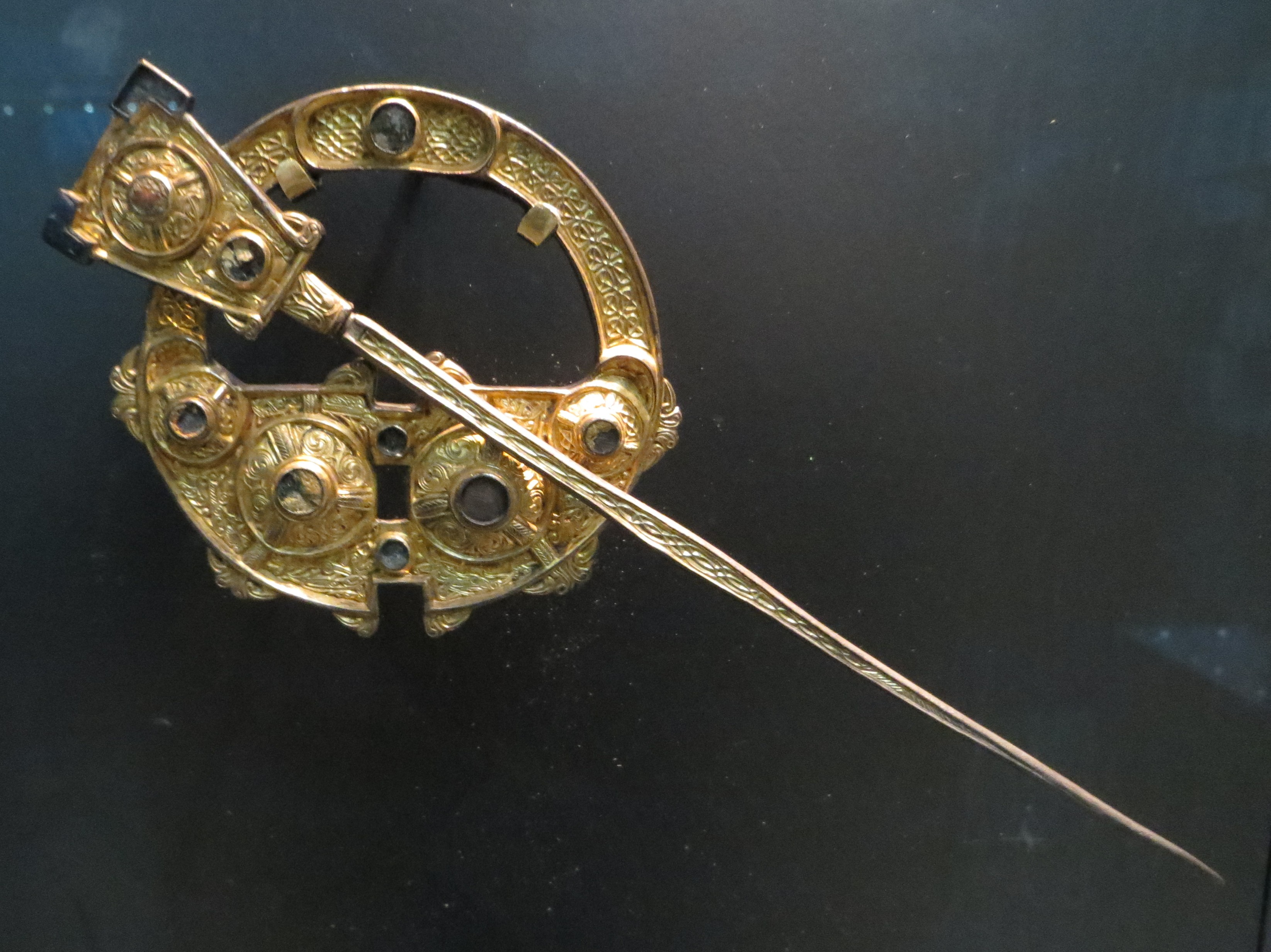
- Material: Silver
- Size: Diameter 10.6 cm, Length 24.2 cm, Weight 201 grammes
- Created: Late 8th Century or early 9th Century AD
- Place: Ireland
- Present location: British Museum
- Identification: 1888,0719.101

The Londesborough Brooch is a Celtic pseudo-penannular brooch from Ireland. Dating from the late eighth or early ninth century, it is a particularly elaborate example of a dress fastener dated to Ireland's artistic golden age, when objects such as the Tara Brooch and Ardagh Chalice were produced. Since 1888, it has been part of the British Museum's collection.

== Description ==
The brooch and pin were cast in silver, though the metal is heavily debased, and tests show it contains about 65% copper, 34% silver, with traces of lead and gold. This might reflect an origin in melted-down late Roman coins. The pieces were thickly gilded on the front, and selectively on parts of the back of the head. The pin was cast in two pieces, head and shank, joined with a rivet. Both head and pin were ornamented with geometric and zoomorphic patterns and inset with amber pieces, some now missing. On the back of the head there are two blue glass studs near where the large terminal joins the hoop. There are many small differences between the decoration of the right and left sides of the head, although the overall impression is one of symmetry. Many details of the decoration recall the earlier Tara Brooch and the Breadalbane Brooch (the latter also in the British Museum). However, unlike most other very elaborate brooches of the type, the Londesborough Brooch lacks any gold filigree decoration, and aspects of the decoration recall larger pieces of church metal work such as shrines.

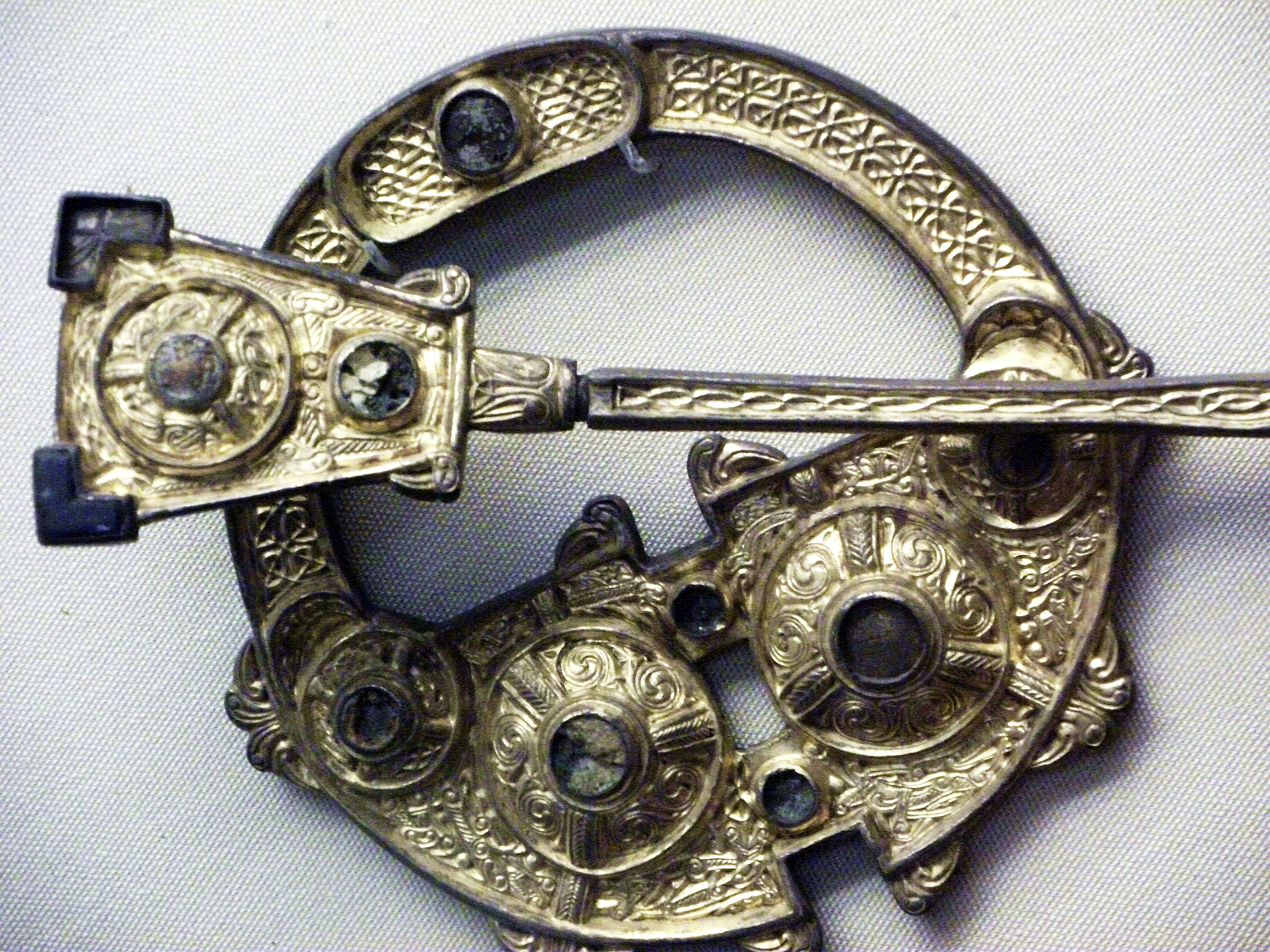
Detail of the brooch

== Commission ==
The intricate decoration on precious metal and the large size of the brooch suggest it was made for a wealthy patron or religious leader in Ireland in the late eighth or early ninth centuries AD. The pseudo-penannular form is typical of Irish brooches at this period; in a true penannular brooch there is a gap in the centre of the wide terminals ending the hoop through which the pin can pass. In the pseudo-penannular type the terminal sides are joined, here by two narrow bands, making the brooch less efficient as a fastener.

== Provenance ==
Little is known about the original circumstances of the brooch's discovery before it became part of Lord Londesborough's collection. The British Museum purchased the brooch in 1888. With the Tara Brooch in Dublin, and the Hunterston Brooch in Edinburgh, it is considered one of the finest of over 50 highly elaborate Irish Celtic brooches to survive.
