= Celtic brooch =

Ring-and-pin clothing fastener

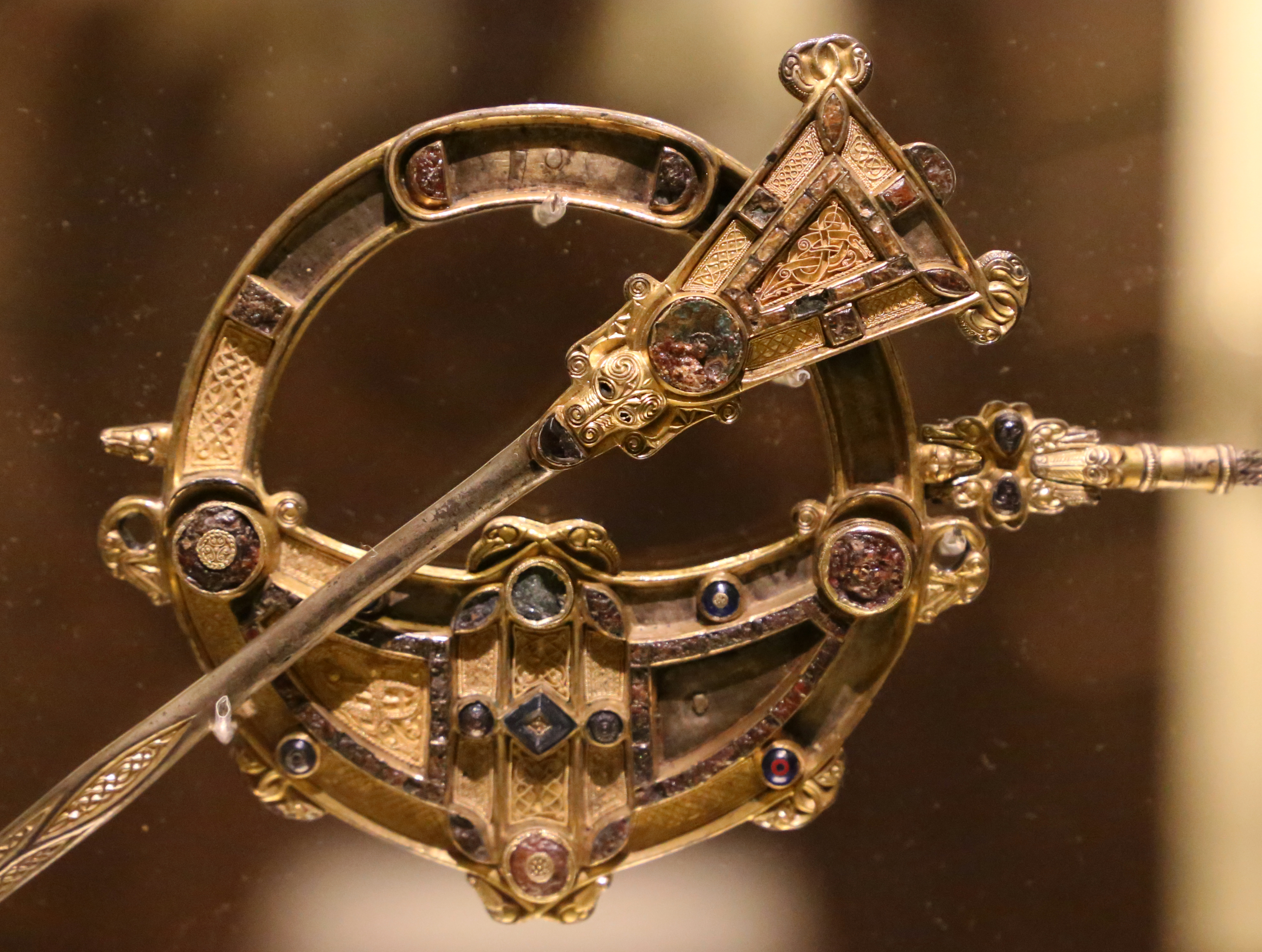
The pseudo-penannular Tara Brooch, the most ornate of all, also decorated on the back (see below). Irish, early 8th century.

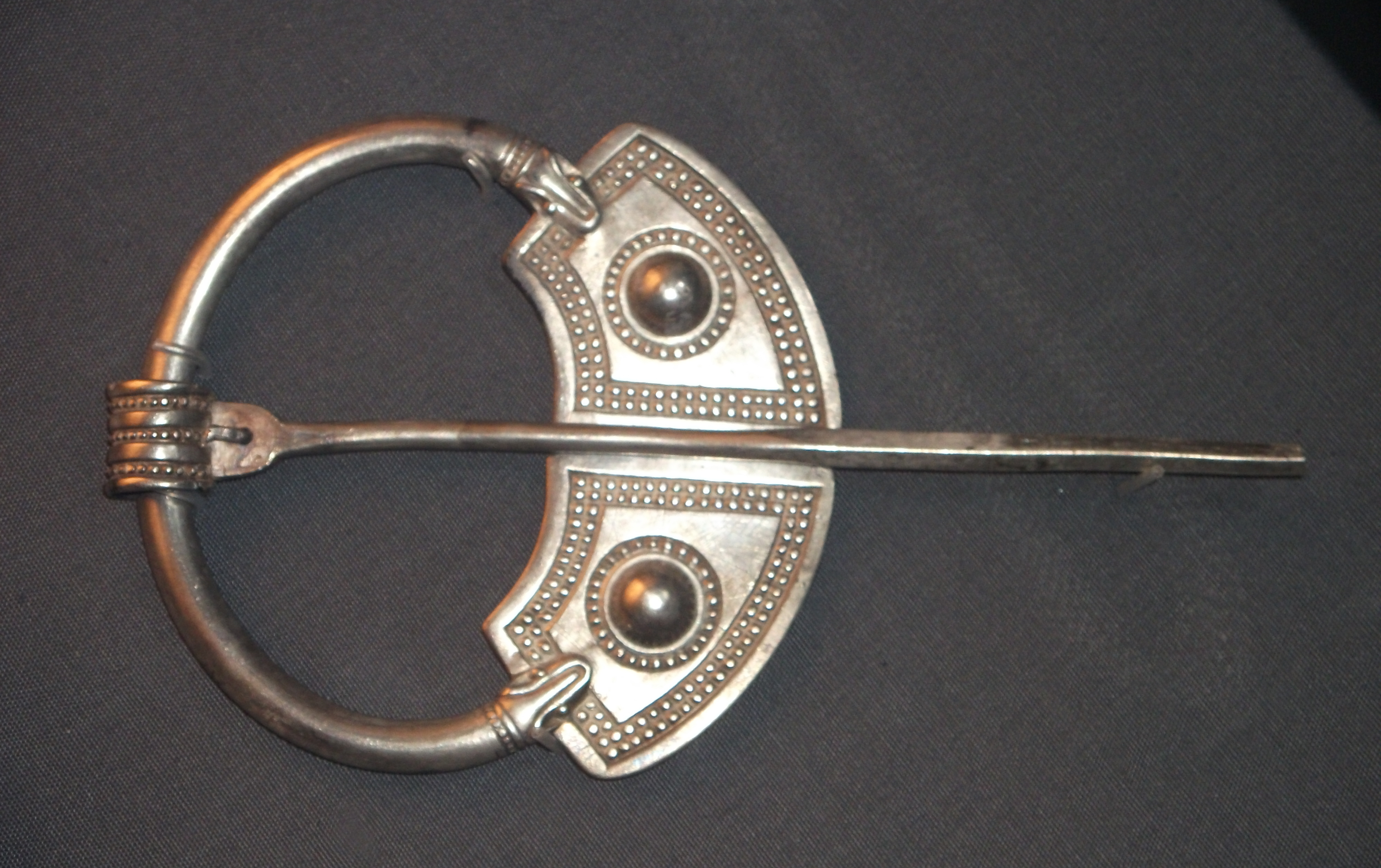
Viking period brooch in silver from the Penrith Hoard

The Celtic brooch, more properly called the penannular brooch, and its closely related type, the pseudo-penannular brooch, are types of brooch clothes fasteners, often rather large; penannular means formed as an incomplete ring. They are especially associated with the beginning of the early medieval period in Ireland and Great Britain, although they are found in other times and places—for example, forming part of traditional female dress in areas in modern North Africa.

Beginning as utilitarian fasteners in the Iron Age and Roman period, they are especially associated with the highly ornate brooches produced in precious metal for the elites of Ireland and Scotland from about 700 to 900, which are popularly known as Celtic brooches or similar terms. They are the most significant objects in high-quality secular metalwork in what is known as Insular art, the early medieval Celtic art produced in the British Isles. The type continued in simpler forms such as the thistle brooch into the 11th century, during what is often known as the Viking Age in Ireland and Scotland.

Both penannular and pseudo-penannular brooches feature a long pin attached by its head to a ring; the pin can move freely around the ring as far as the terminals, which are close together. In the true penannular type, the ring is not closed; there is a gap between the terminals wide enough for the pin to pass through. In the pseudo-penannular type, the ring is closed, but there are still two separately defined terminals, which are joined by a further element. The penannular type is a simple and efficient way of fastening loosely woven cloth (where the pin will not leave a permanent hole), but the pseudo-penannular type is notably less efficient.

The brooches were worn by both men and women, usually singly at the shoulder by men and on the breast by women, and with the pin pointing up; an Irish law code says that in the event of injury from a pin to another person, the wearer is not at fault if the pin did not project too far and the brooch was worn in these ways by the sexes. The most elaborate examples were clearly significant expressions of status at the top of society, which were also worn by clergy, at least in Ireland, though probably to fasten copes and other vestments rather than as everyday wear. The Senchas Mór, an early Irish law tract, specified that the sons of major kings, when being fostered, should have "brooches of gold having crystal inserted in them", while the sons of minor kings need wear only silver brooches.

== Terminology ==
"Annular" means formed as a ring and "penannular" formed as an incomplete ring; both terms have a range of uses. "Pseudo-penannular" is a coinage restricted to brooches, and refers to those brooches where there is no opening in the ring, but the design retains features of a penannular brooch—for example, emphasizing two terminals. Some pseudo-penannular brooches are very similar in design to other penannular brooches, but have a small section joining the two terminals. Others have fully joined terminals, and emphasize in their design the central area where the gap would be—for example the Tara Brooch. Pseudo-penannular brooches may also be described as "annular", or as "ring brooches".

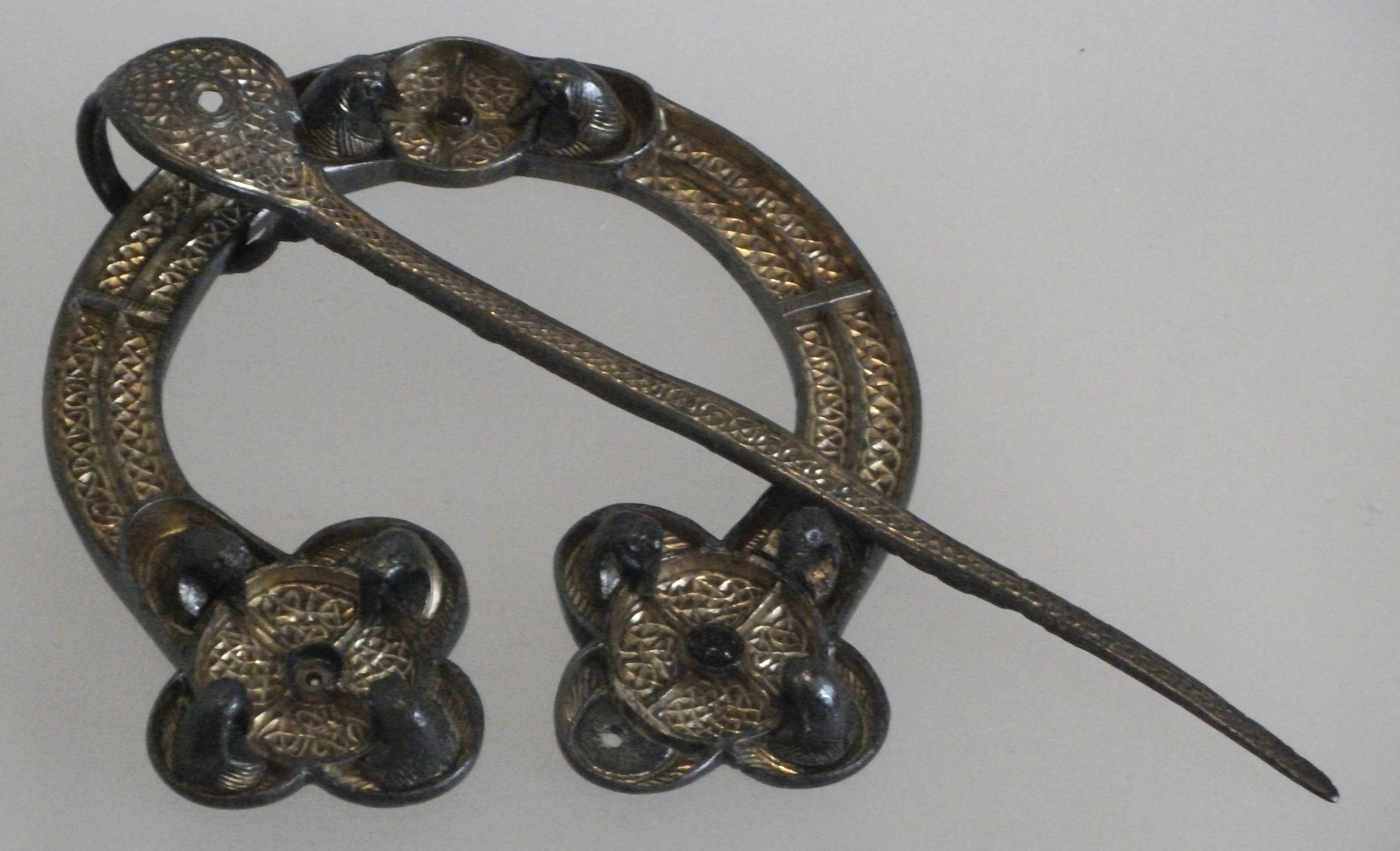
The Rogart Brooch, National Museums of Scotland, FC2. Pictish penannular brooch, 8th century. Silver with gilding and glass. Classified as Fowler H3 type.

The terms "open brooch" or "open ring brooch" are also sometimes used for penannular brooches. There is a scheme of classification originally set out, in relation to earlier types, by Elizabeth Fowler in the 1960s, which has since been extended in various versions to cover later types.

Brooches of either penannular or annular type, where the pin is very large in relation to the ring, so that the ring cannot play any part in the fastening of the brooch, may be called "ring brooches", "pin brooches", or "brooch-pins"; or, especially where the ring is small and plain, "ringed pins". In these, the design of the pin head typically shows that the pin is intended to sit underneath the ring (seen from the front), rather than on top of it as in the larger brooches.

"Celtic" is a term avoided by specialists in describing objects, and especially artistic styles, of the Early Middle Ages from the British Isles, but is firmly fixed in the popular mind. The term Insular art is used to describe the distinct style of art originating in the British Isles and combining Germanic, Celtic, Pictish and Mediterranean elements. Although some simpler and relatively early penannular brooches are found in Anglo-Saxon contexts, and some sub-types predominantly so, as far as is known the Anglo-Saxons did not use these brooch styles for prestige elite jewellery. However, there are elements in the style of Irish and Scottish brooches deriving from Anglo-Saxon art, and related to Insular work in other media, especially illuminated manuscripts.

Fibula is Latin for "brooch" and is used in modern languages to describe the many types of Roman and post-Roman early medieval brooches with pins and catches behind the main face of the brooch. The brooches discussed here are sometimes also called fibulae, but rarely by English-speaking specialists.

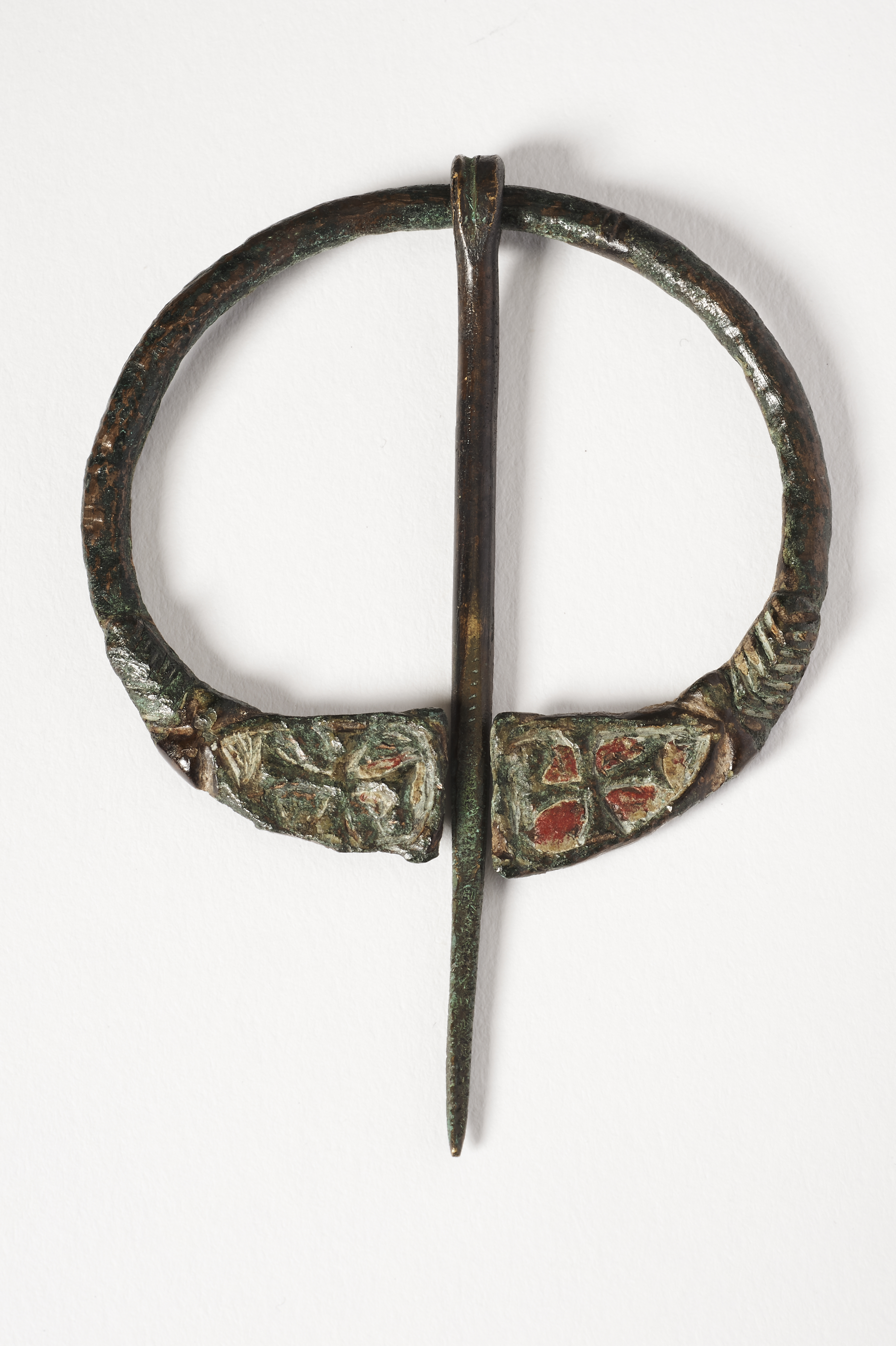
Bronze zoomorphic penannular brooch, Co. Antrim, 6th century AD. The Hunt Museum (Limerick, Ireland).

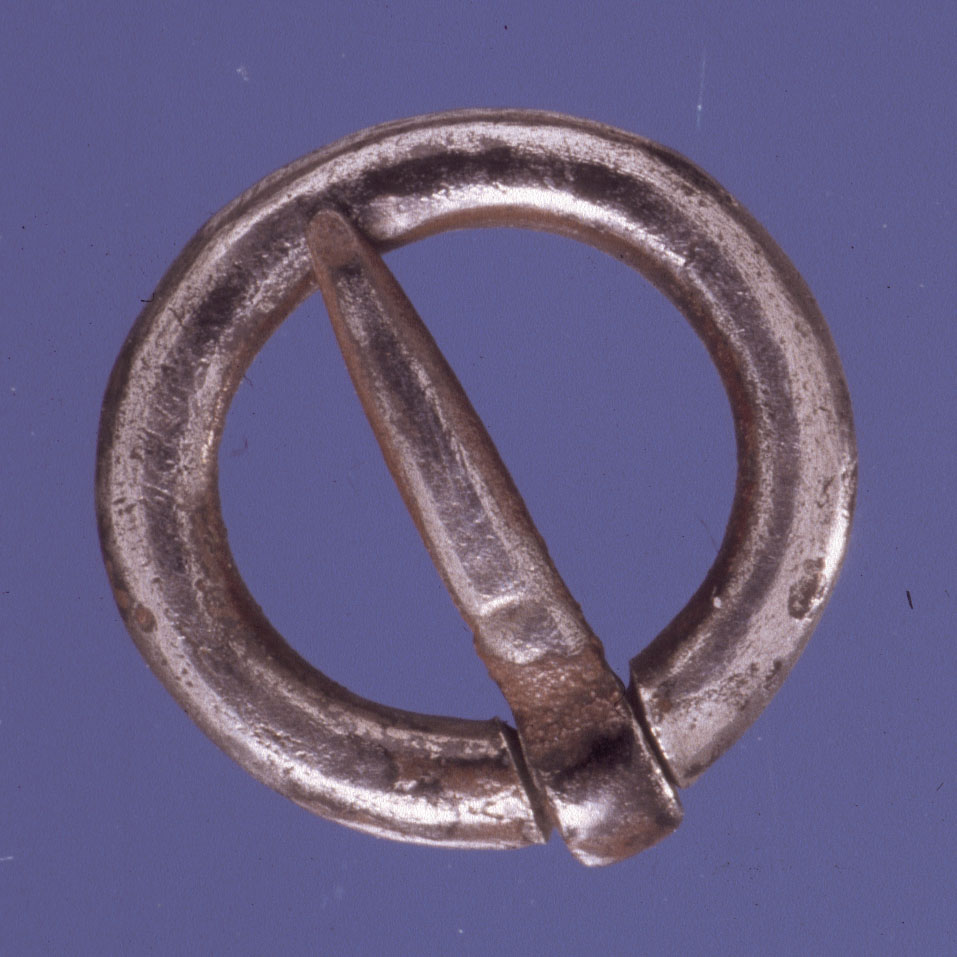
Plain silver medieval annular brooch; note that the pin cannot move along the ring

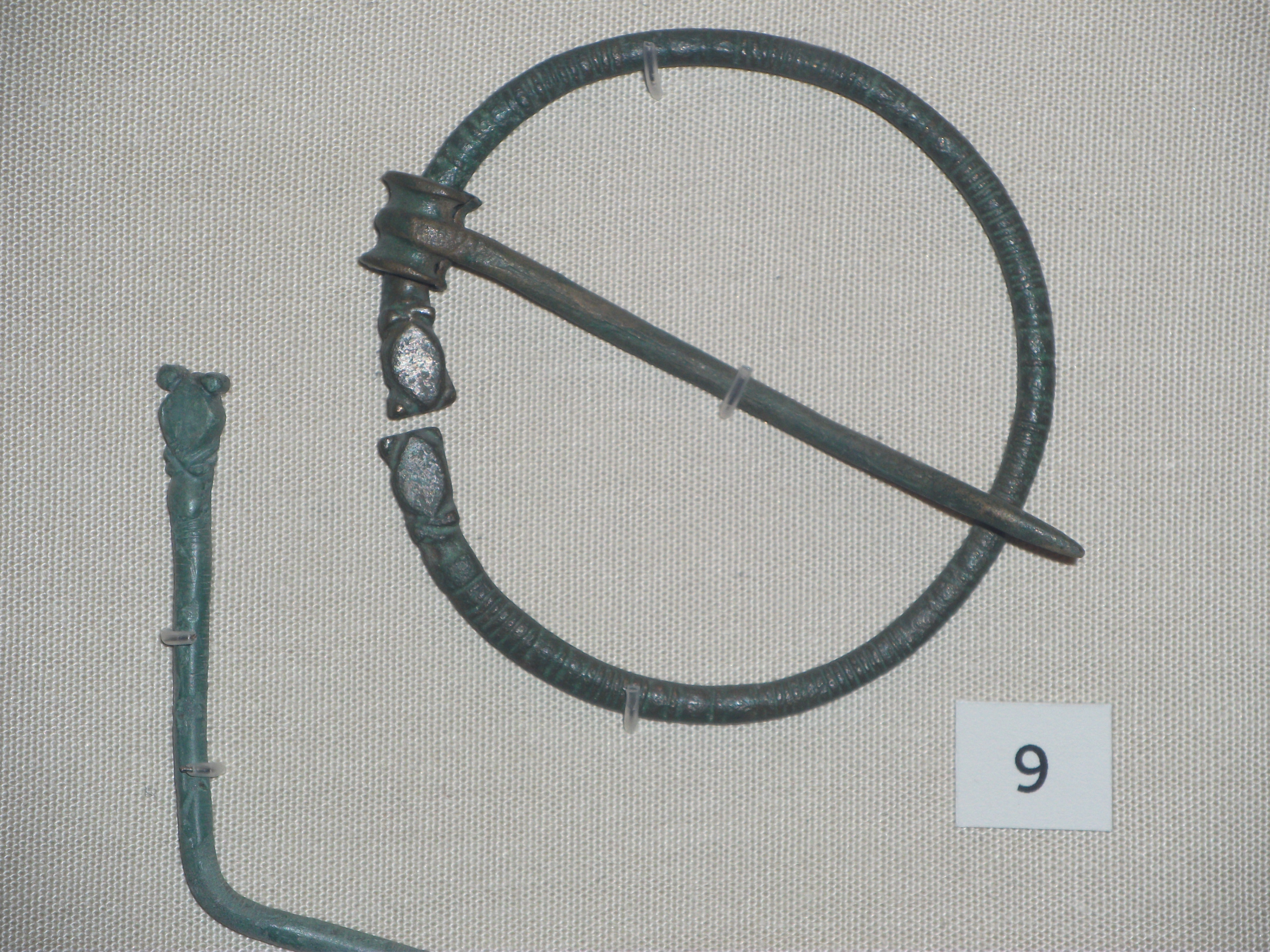
Romano-British penannular brooch in bronze

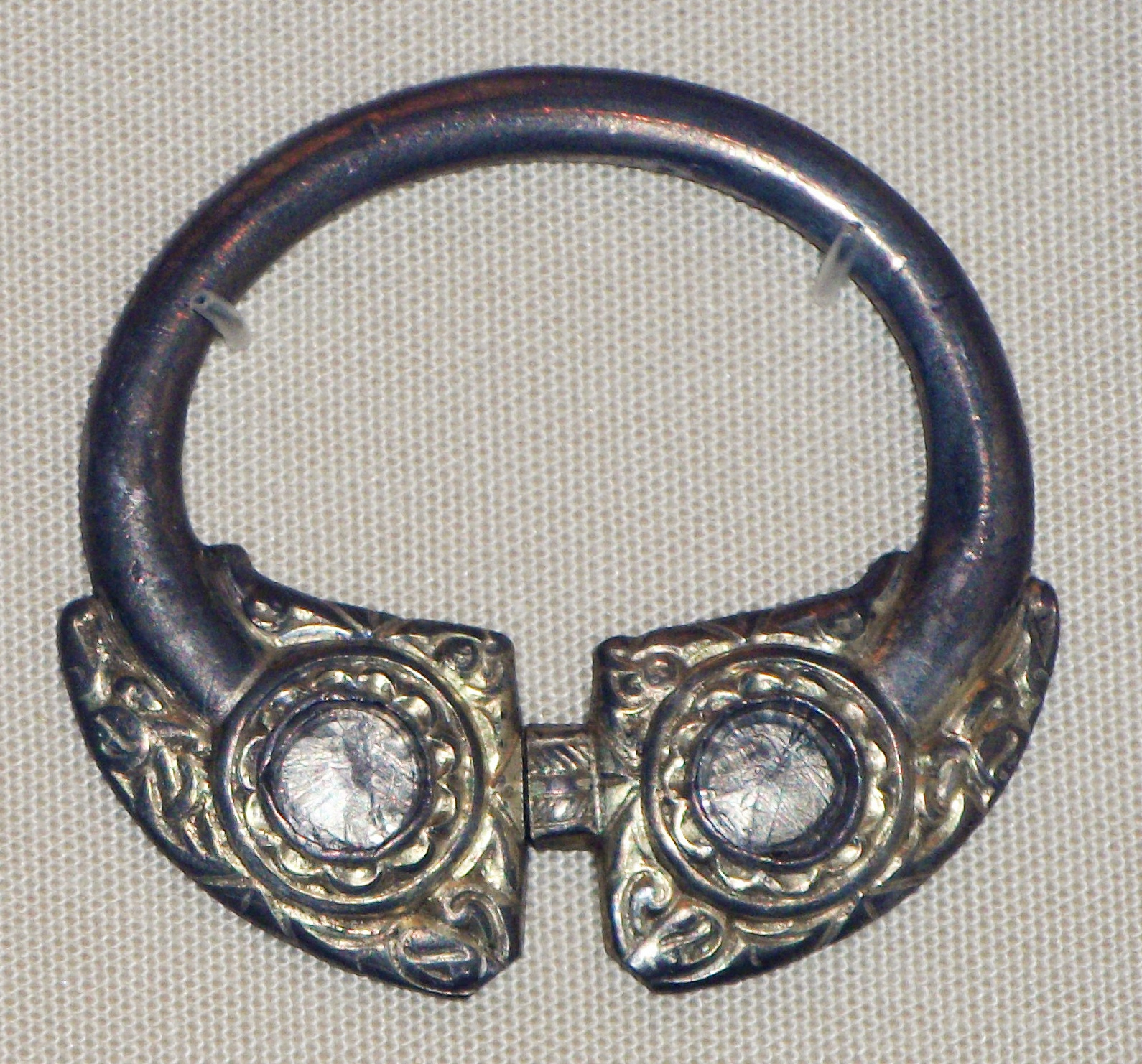
Simple pseudo-penannular brooch (pin missing)

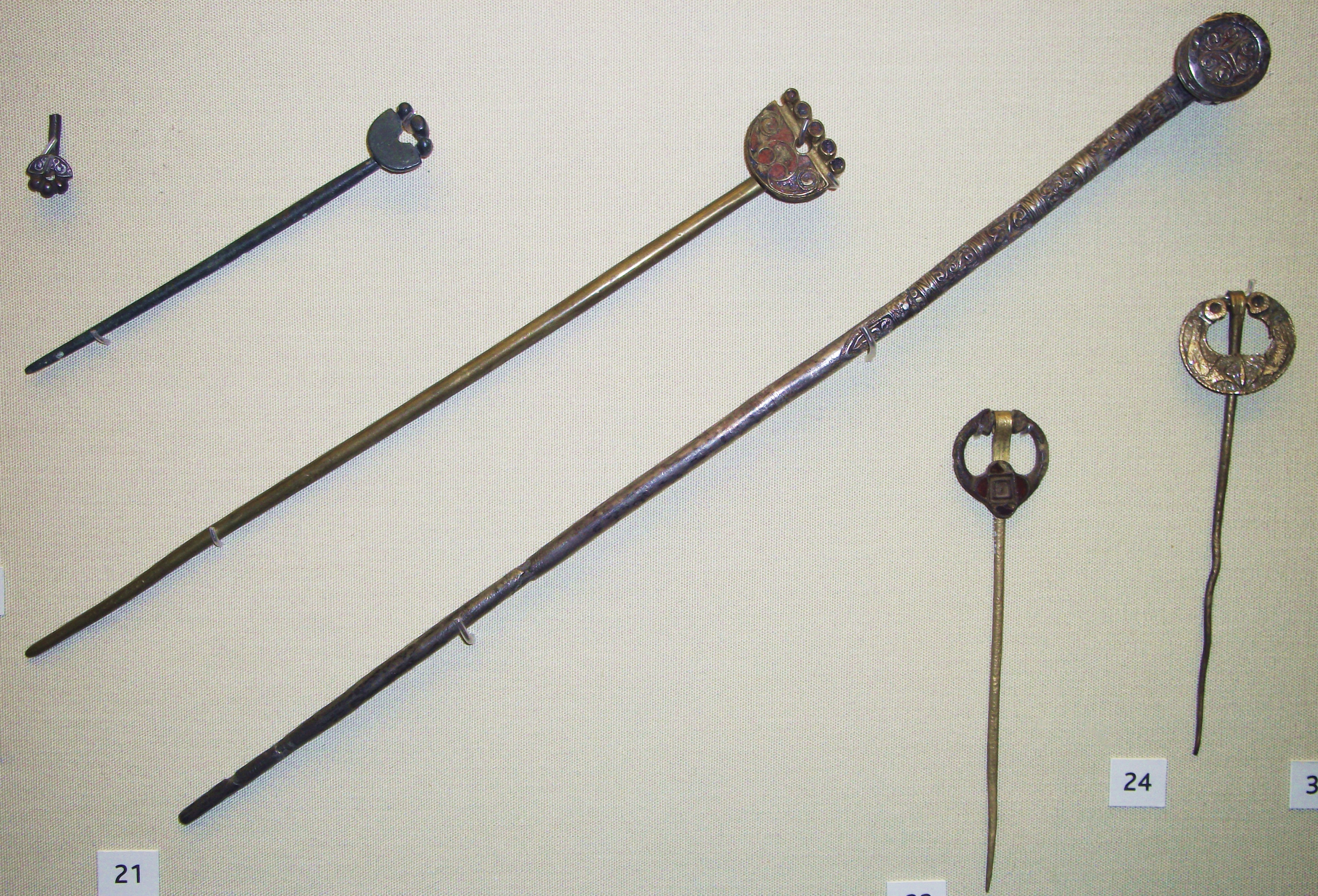
Pin-brooches and ring-pins

== Fastening the brooches ==
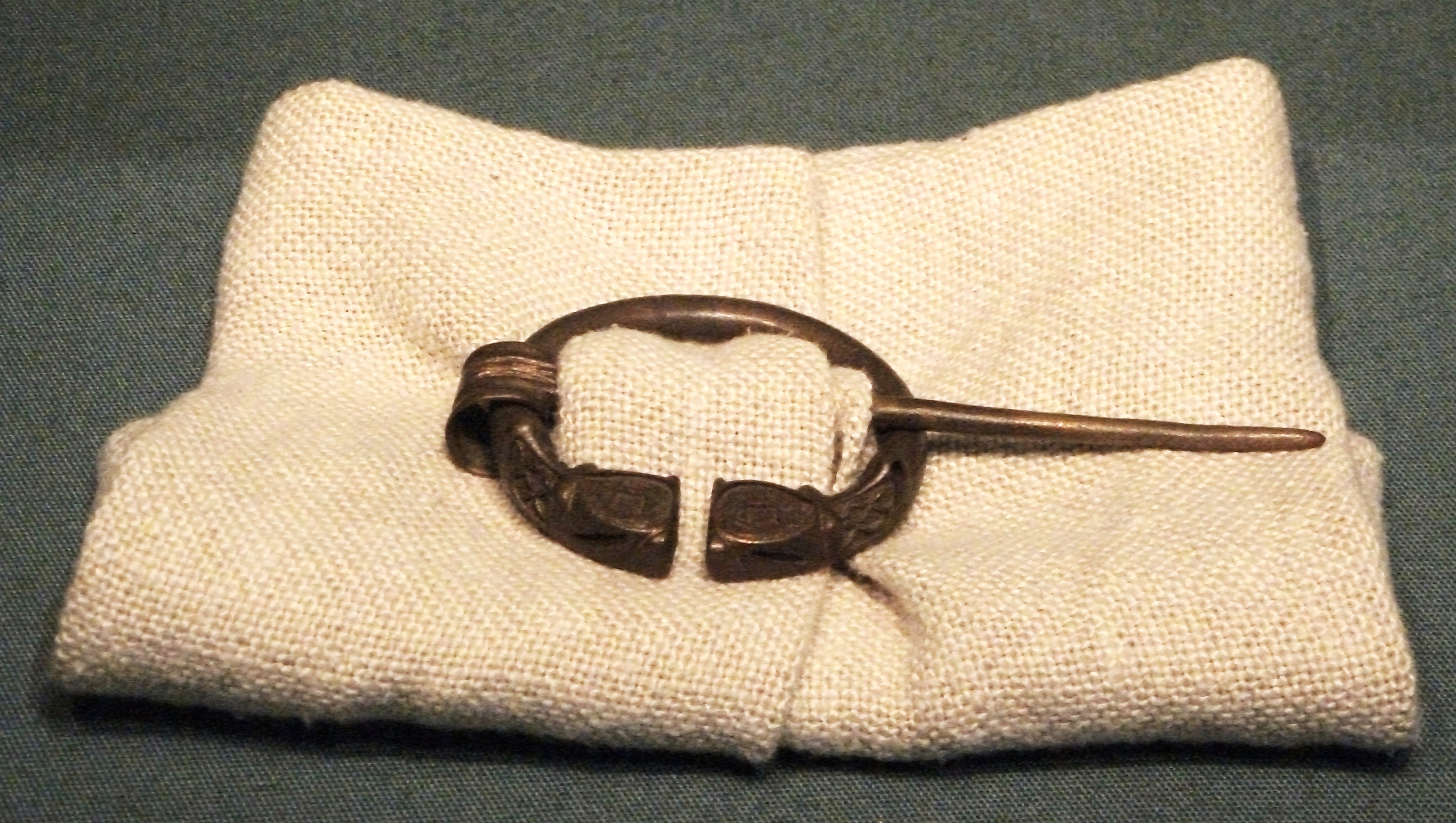
Mock-up with modern fabric, showing how the brooches were used.

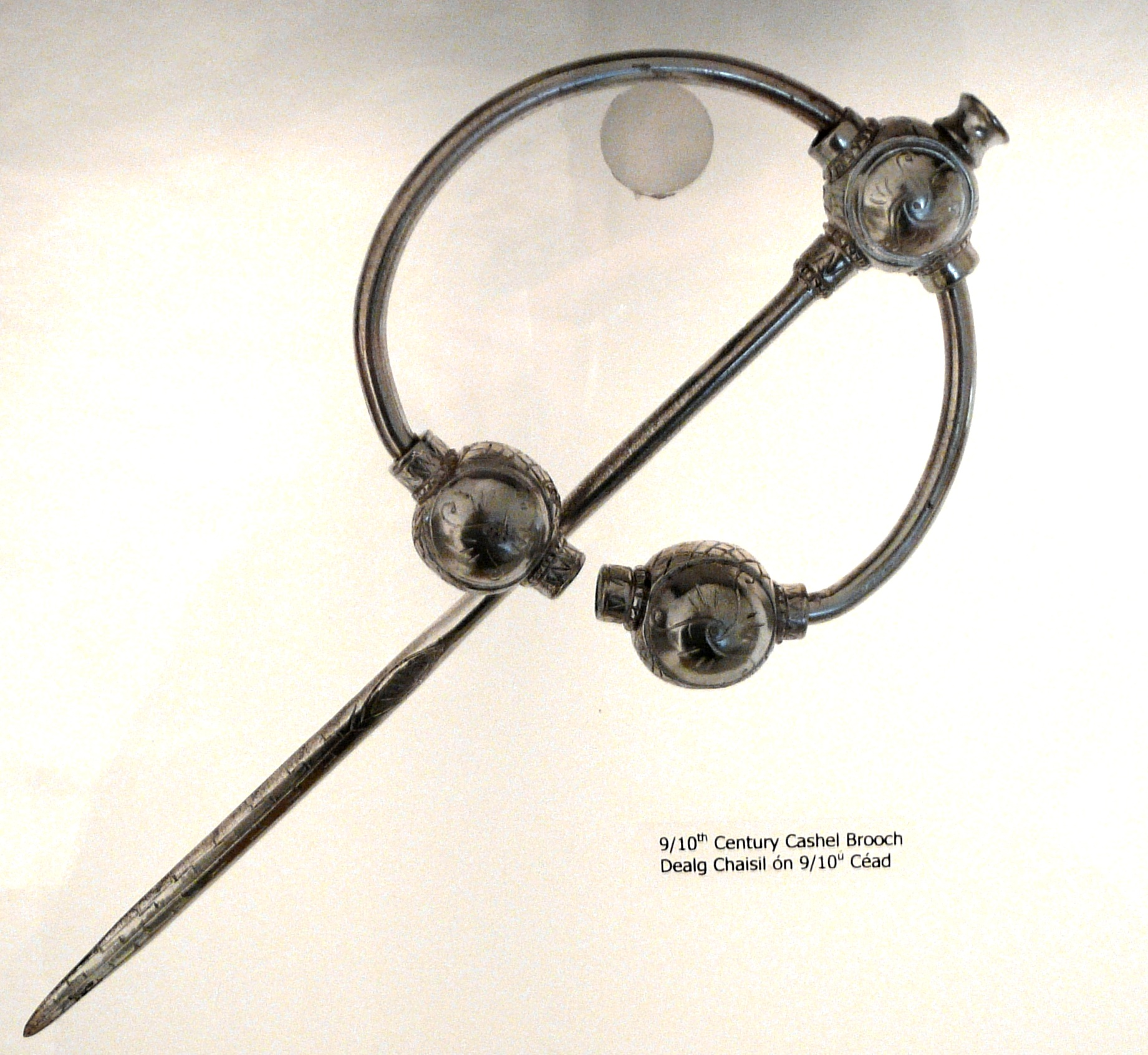
Cashel Brooch, 9th or 10th century, from the Rock of Cashel.

With a penannular brooch, the pin is pushed through folds of the cloth, which are then pulled back inside the ring; the free end of the pin passes through the gap in the ring. The pin is then rotated around the ring by 90 degrees or so, so that as long as the pin is held down by slight pressure it cannot escape over the terminals, and the fastening is secure.

With pseudo-penannular brooches, things are not so simple and the manner in which they were used is still debated; the method was probably not the same for all brooches. One method may have been to pull folds of the cloth through the ring until they could be pierced by the pin, and then pull the cloth back until the pin rested on the ring. This would work best with brooches with a pin not much longer than the diameter of the ring, which some have, but others do not. The second method might have been simply to pin the cloth vertically, leaving the ring hanging unattached to the cloth; this does not seem very secure. The third method relied on a length of chain or cord attached to the ring near the "terminals" (which in pseudo-penannular brooches do not actually terminate), which was used to secure the pin by tying it down, perhaps with a small pin at the end, which was also put through the cloth. The Tara Brooch was probably fastened in this way. In some cases the pin was fitted with a bolt or rivet to make it removable. A further complication is that in some pseudo-penannular brooches the pin is fixed to lie in front of the ring, as in the Londesborough Brooch (below), but in others it crosses through the ring, starting with the head end in front of the ring, but the middle of the pin behind the ring by the point where it crosses at the other side; the Tara Brooch has been displayed set up in both ways. The latter arrangement seems more common in later brooches, of the 9th century.

It is fair to say that scholars remain slightly puzzled that the effective and simple penannular brooch developed in this direction, though it is presumed that the reuniting of the terminals of pseudo-penannular brooches was partly to strengthen the brooch. In many penannular brooches, the gap between the terminals is now too narrow for the pin to pass through; whether this was always the case is uncertain.

== History ==
=== Roman and early Insular period ===
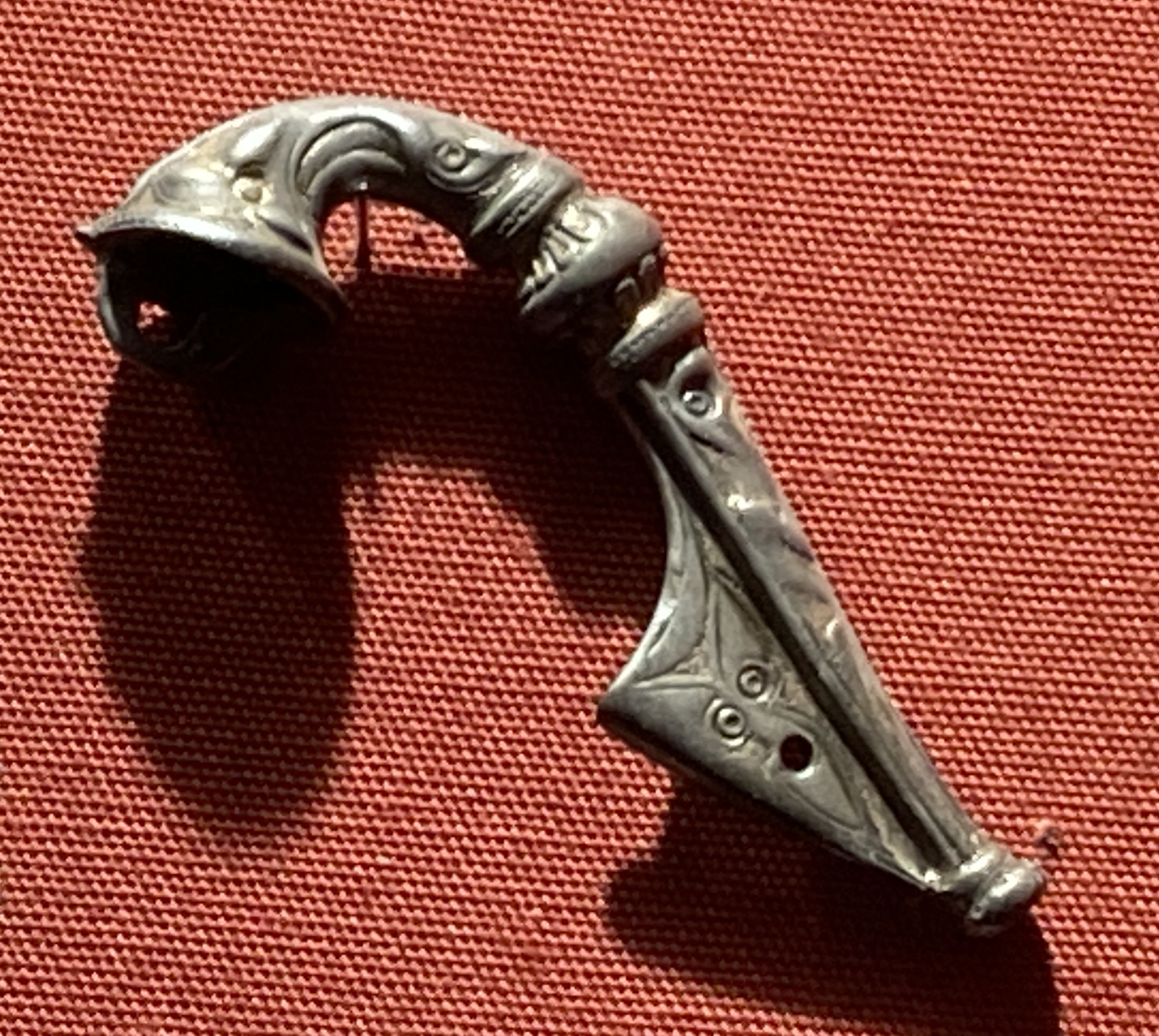
Silver gilt "trumpet" brooch with Celtic spirals similar to those in the Book of Durrow. British, 1st or 2nd century, Trinity College Dublin

Small and simple penannular brooches in bronze, iron, and, rarely, silver were common in the Roman period as a practical fastener, but were not used for high-status objects, and any decoration was normally limited to bands around the ring or other simple patterns. Often the extra thickness at the terminal, necessary to prevent the pin just falling off, is achieved simply by turning back the ends of the ring.

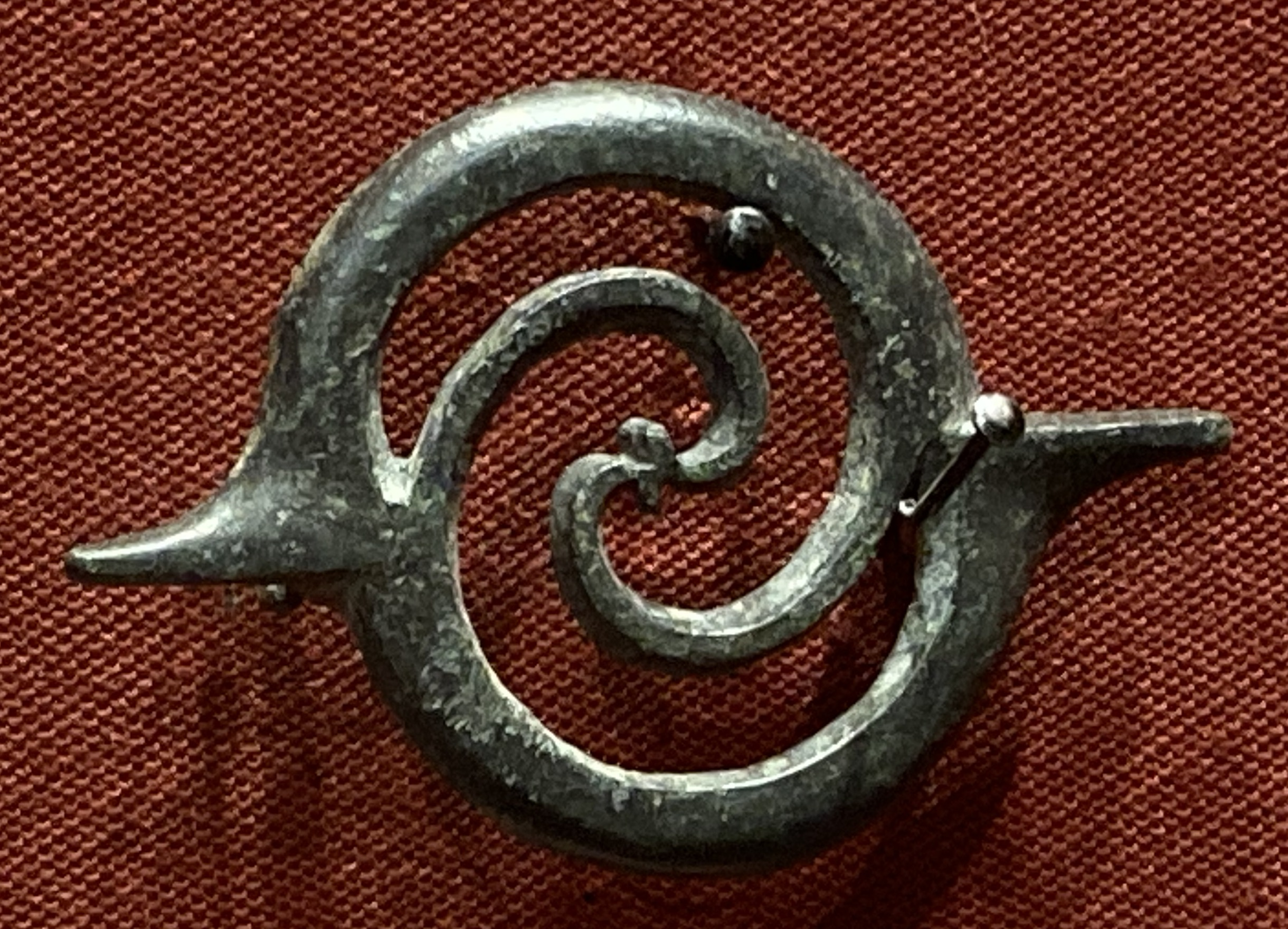
S-shaped enamelled brooch, 1st century, Trinity College Dublin. Celtic and Romano-British tradition

In the late Roman period in Britain in the 3rd and 4th centuries, a type of penannular brooch with zoomorphic decoration to the terminals appeared, with human or animal heads, still not much wider than the rest of the ring. Some examples had enamel decoration, and the pin did not extend much beyond the ring. These are found especially in southwestern Britain and Wales, and seem to have developed in these areas. This type fell from favour in southern Britain by the 5th century, but was developed in Ireland by the 6–7th centuries.

These types considerably extended the size of the terminals, which now presented a flattish area often decorated with enamel or glass inlay, mostly using abstracted patterns but sometimes zoomorphic decoration. The length of the pin is now often about twice the diameter of the ring. The Irish cultural zone in this period included much of Western Scotland, and in Pictish East Scotland a similar development took place, though the forms are somewhat different here. The decoration paralleled that on other metalwork fittings such as pieces of harness-tackle, and the few remaining early Christian reliquaries and other pieces of church metalwork.

=== Golden Age ===
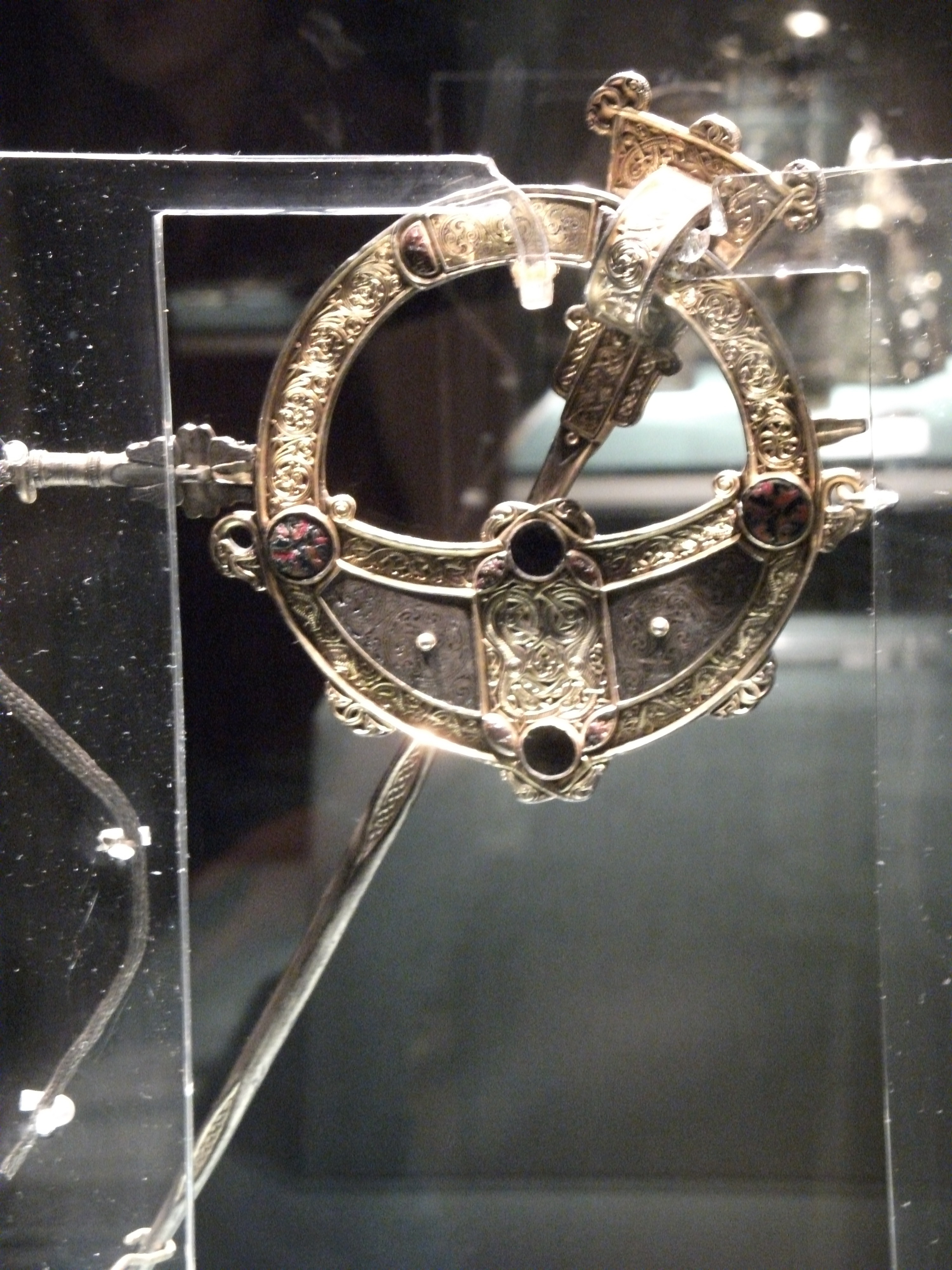
Tara Brooch, rear view.

By shortly after 700, highly elaborate, large brooches in precious metal and gems were being produced. These were clearly expressions of high status for the wearer, and use the full repertoire of goldsmith's techniques at a very high level of skill. They continued to be produced for about 200 years; the Pictish brooches are much more homogeneous in design than the Irish ones, which may indicate a shorter period of production, possibly from "the mid-eighth to the beginning of the ninth centuries". Each surviving design is unique, but the range of types established in the more modest earlier brooches are developed and elaborated upon. There was no previous tradition of very ornate brooches in Ireland, and this development may have come from contact with Continental elites who wore large fibulae as marks of status. Such contacts were certainly made, especially by travelling monks.

Archaeological, and some literary, evidence suggests that brooches in precious metal were a mark of royal status, along with wearing a purple cloak, and it is probably as such that they are worn by Christ on a high cross at Monasterboice and by the Virgin Mary on another. All surviving examples, numbering over 50 (not all complete) in the case of the Irish ones, have been recovered by excavation, or at least finding in the ground, but where the detailed circumstances of the find are known, few are from graves, and finds in hoards are much more common. When they were in graves, the burials are often much later than the date of the brooch, as in a brooch in the Irish 8th century style found in a Norse burial in Westray, Orkney, and possibly the Kilmainham Brooch. Elaborate brooches often have one or more names—presumed to be those of owners—scratched on the reverse, often in runes. Plainer brooches in bronze and similar alloys continue to be found in much larger numbers.

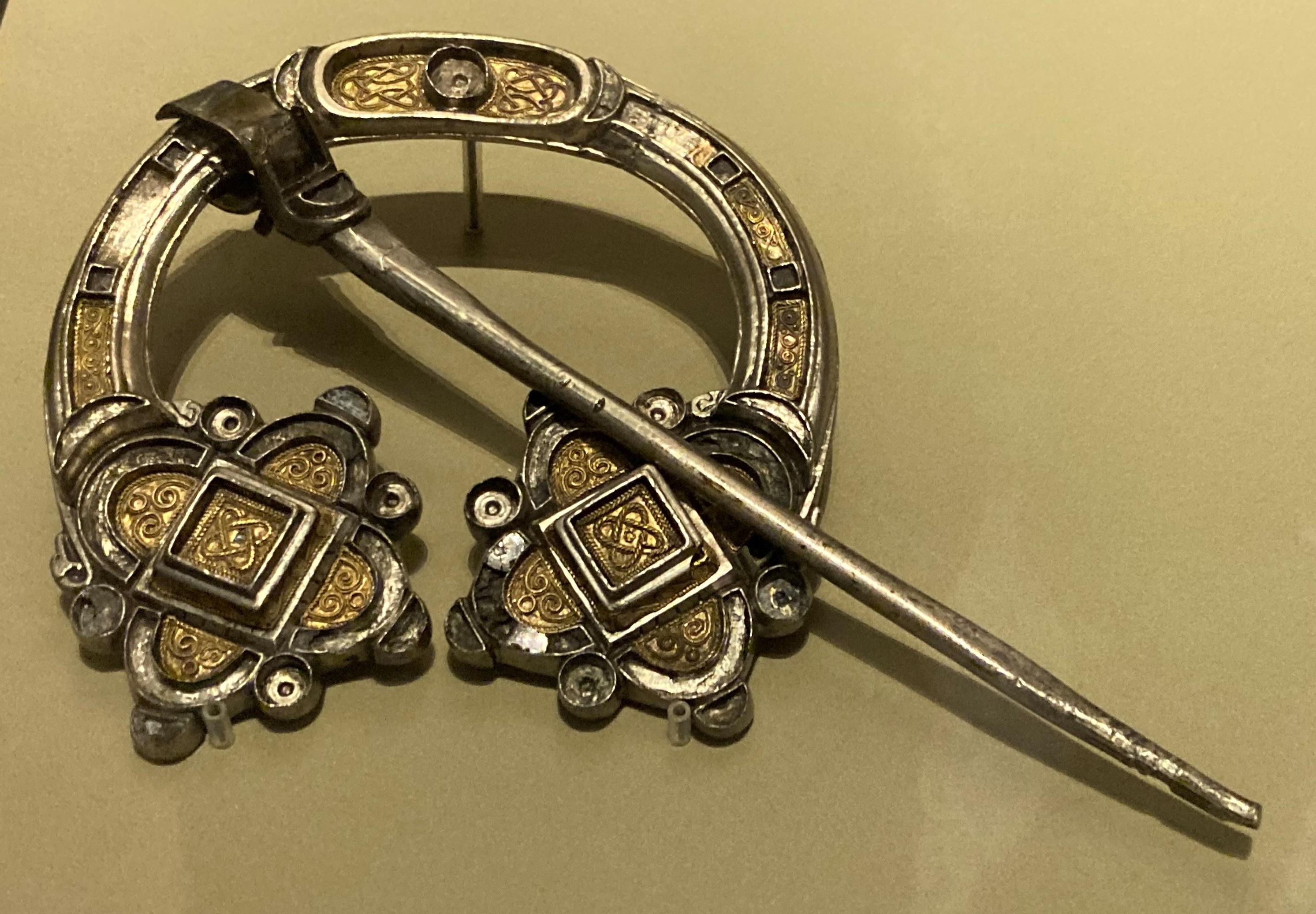
The Kilmainham Brooch (Irish, late 8th- or early 9th–century) contains influence from Pictish art and metalwork.

The most elaborate Irish brooches are pseudo-penannular, while the Scottish ones mostly retain true penannular forms. Most are silver-gilt, the gilding often partial. Some are gilded base metal, of bronze or copper-alloy; only one solid gold Irish brooch is known, a 9th-century one from Loughan, County Londonderry, which is less elaborate than most of the series, though the standard of work is very high. However, some brooches have a hidden recess which may have contained small lead weights to make the precious metal used seem more valuable than it actually was.

In Ireland, the head of the pin might be turned into a focus for decoration, sometimes using a "kite"-shaped plate, such as that on the Tara Brooch; in Scotland, the pin-heads were simple circles formed by bending the pin back on itself. Scottish terminals are more often distinct lobed or square shapes extending beyond the circle of the ring on both sides, while in Irish examples, the terminals typically extend inside the ring forming another curve, but not much outside it, or sometimes form a straight line across the interior of the ring. Irish brooches may only join the two terminals by narrow strips, or not only eliminate the gap entirely, but have a central zone of decoration where the gap between the terminals would have been; the brooches found with the Ardagh Chalice show both types.

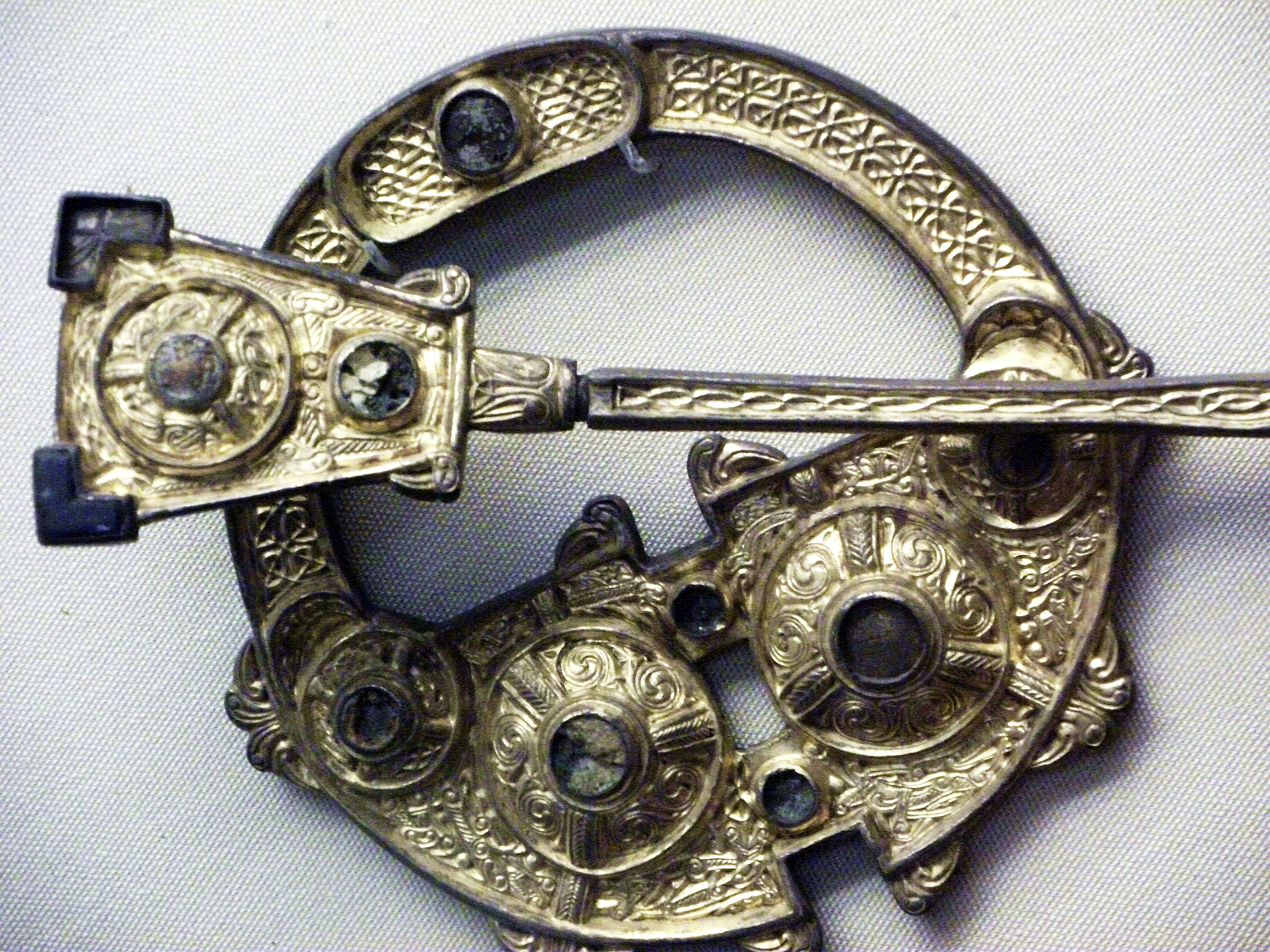
Detail of the Londesborough Brooch (late 8th- or early 9th–century)

The main body was normally cast, and a number of elements of two-piece moulds have been found. Many brooches have cells for studs or bosses that are most often round hemispheres, but may be square, lozenges or other shapes; very often the studs themselves are now missing. These are in a variety of materials including glass, enamel, amber, and gemstones found locally, although not including any of the classic modern "precious stones", or even the garnets found in Anglo-Saxon jewellery. However the millefiori glass rods sometimes used appear to have been imported from Italy, like those used in the Anglo-Saxon jewellery from Sutton Hoo; examples of the rods have been excavated in both Ireland and England.

Like the Insular chalices and other metalwork, the very ornate Irish brooches were mostly made in many pieces which are pinned or slotted together. Filigree decoration was often made on "trays" which fitted into the main ring — on the Tara Brooch many of these are now missing (most were still in place when it was found in 1850).

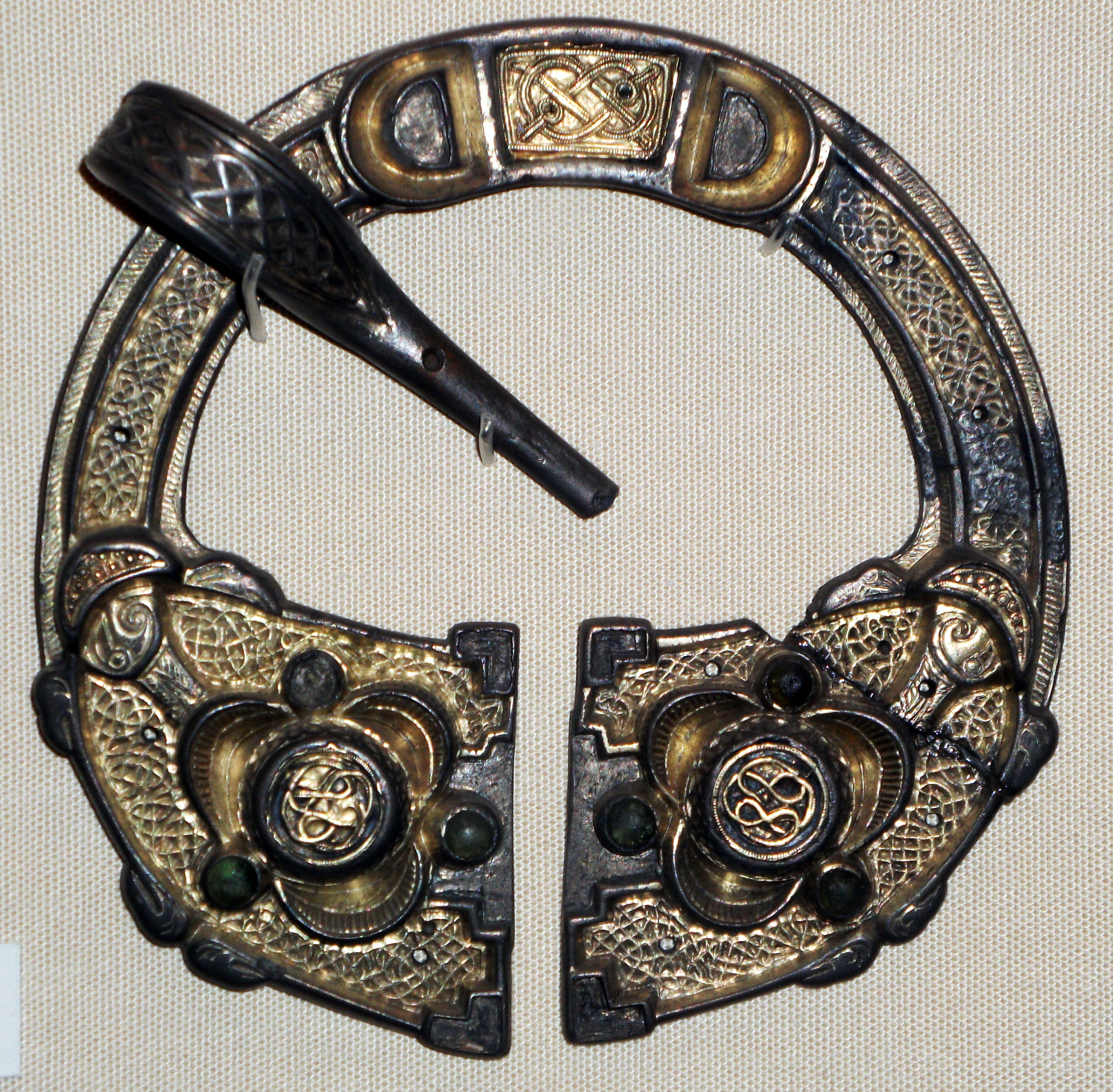
The Breadalbane Brooch, Irish, 8th century, converted from its original pseudo-penannular form in 9th century Scotland.

Techniques include chip-carving, cast "imitation chip-carving", filigree, engraving, inlays of various types including niello, glass and champlevé enamel, and various hammering and chasing techniques: "the range of materials and techniques is almost the full range known to man." Two techniques that do not appear are the "true pierced openwork interasile, much used in Byzantine jewellery", and the cloisonné work that typified much Western European jewellery, and especially large fibulae, at the time, whether in enamel or stone inlays like the garnets used so effectively at Sutton Hoo and in the Anglo-Saxon Staffordshire Hoard. In the gilded brooches, enamel is restricted to studs that punctuate the composition like gems; the larger areas of champlevé found on the flared terminals of earlier types perhaps continue in simpler types, though dating is difficult.

On some brooches the decoration is too detailed to be appreciated when the brooch is being worn, and some of the most elaborate brooches have their backs, invisible when worn, decorated almost as elaborately as their fronts. The Tara Brooch shows both features, and in addition, shares with some others a difference in decorative styles between front and back, with "Celtic" triskeles and other spiral motifs restricted to the back, while the front has more interlace and zoomorphic elements. These features are also shared by the most ornate brooches in London and Edinburgh, respectively the Londesborough and Hunterston Brooches. This may be because decoration on the backs relies more on engraving than filigree, which would risk wires getting caught in the clothing on which the brooch was worn.

Few of the major brooches, or indeed other metalwork, have been found in contexts that can be easily dated, and much of the dating of at least the earlier ones comes from comparison with Insular illuminated manuscripts, though the dating of these is often itself far from certain. The Tara Brooch has long been recognised as having clear stylistic similarities to the Lindisfarne Gospels, thought to date to about 698–715. Many of the similarities are to the carpet pages, highly detailed ornamental pages filled with decoration, which share with the brooch a certain horror vacui that leaves no area unembellished, and also complex decoration that is extremely small and perfectly executed, and best appreciated when seen at a larger than actual scale, whether in the original or in photographs. Both combine elements from many stylistic origins into a style that is distinctly Insular: La Tène Celtic art, Germanic animal style, and classical and other Mediterranean styles.

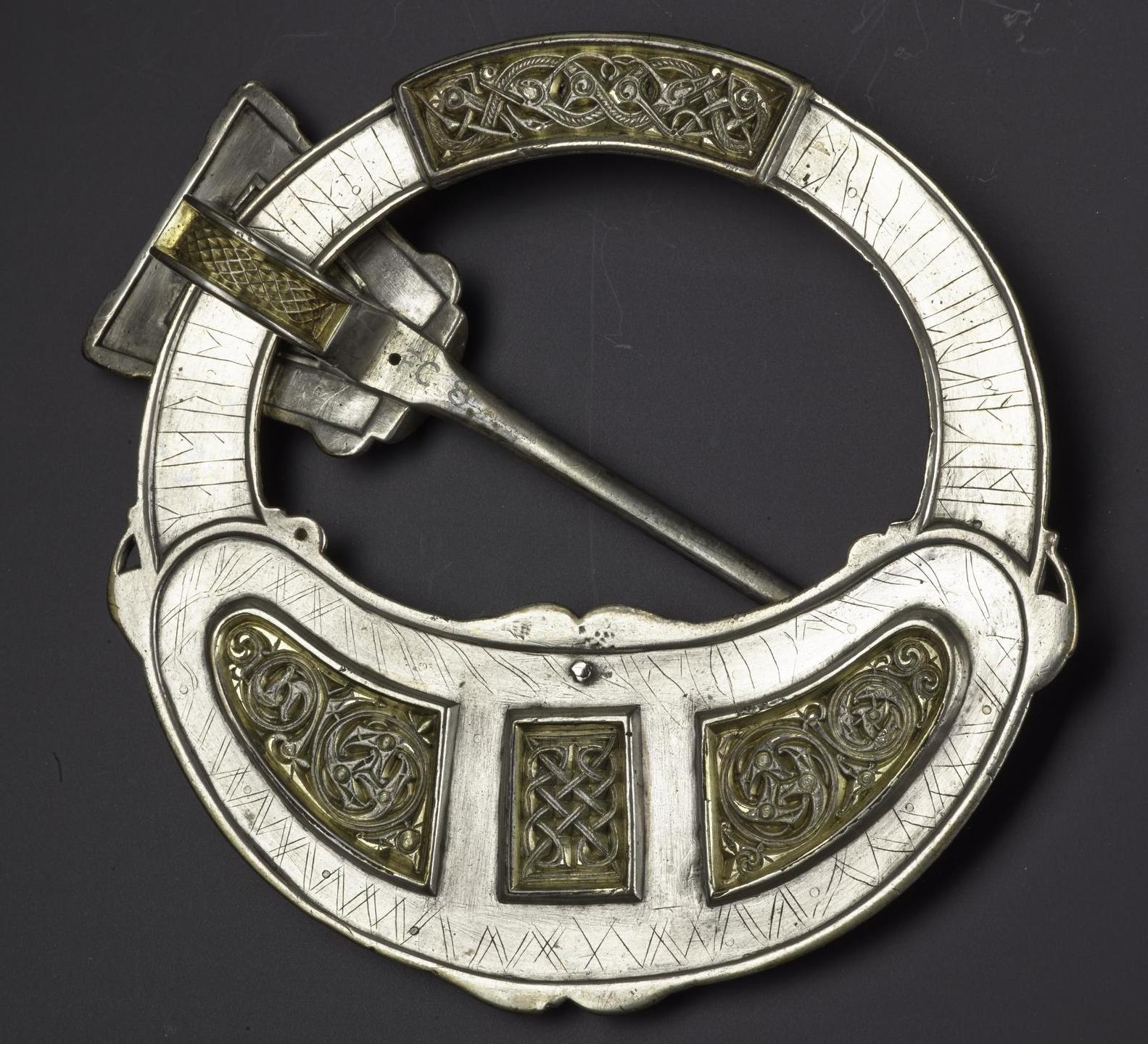
Rear of the Hunterston Brooch, an early and elaborate Irish-style brooch found in Scotland, showing a much later Viking owner's inscription

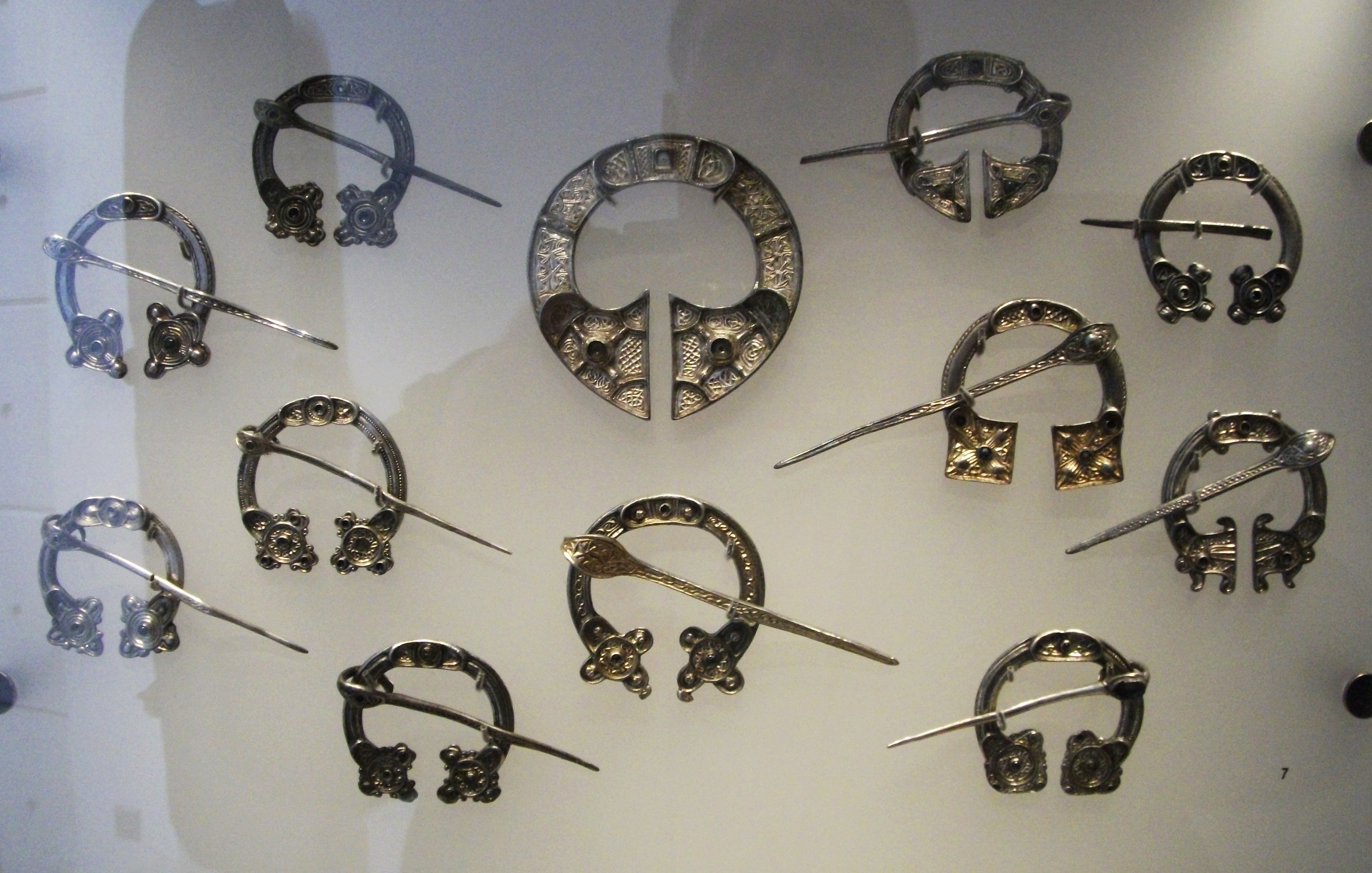
The Pictish brooches in the St Ninian's Isle Treasure, with typical Pictish lobed terminals

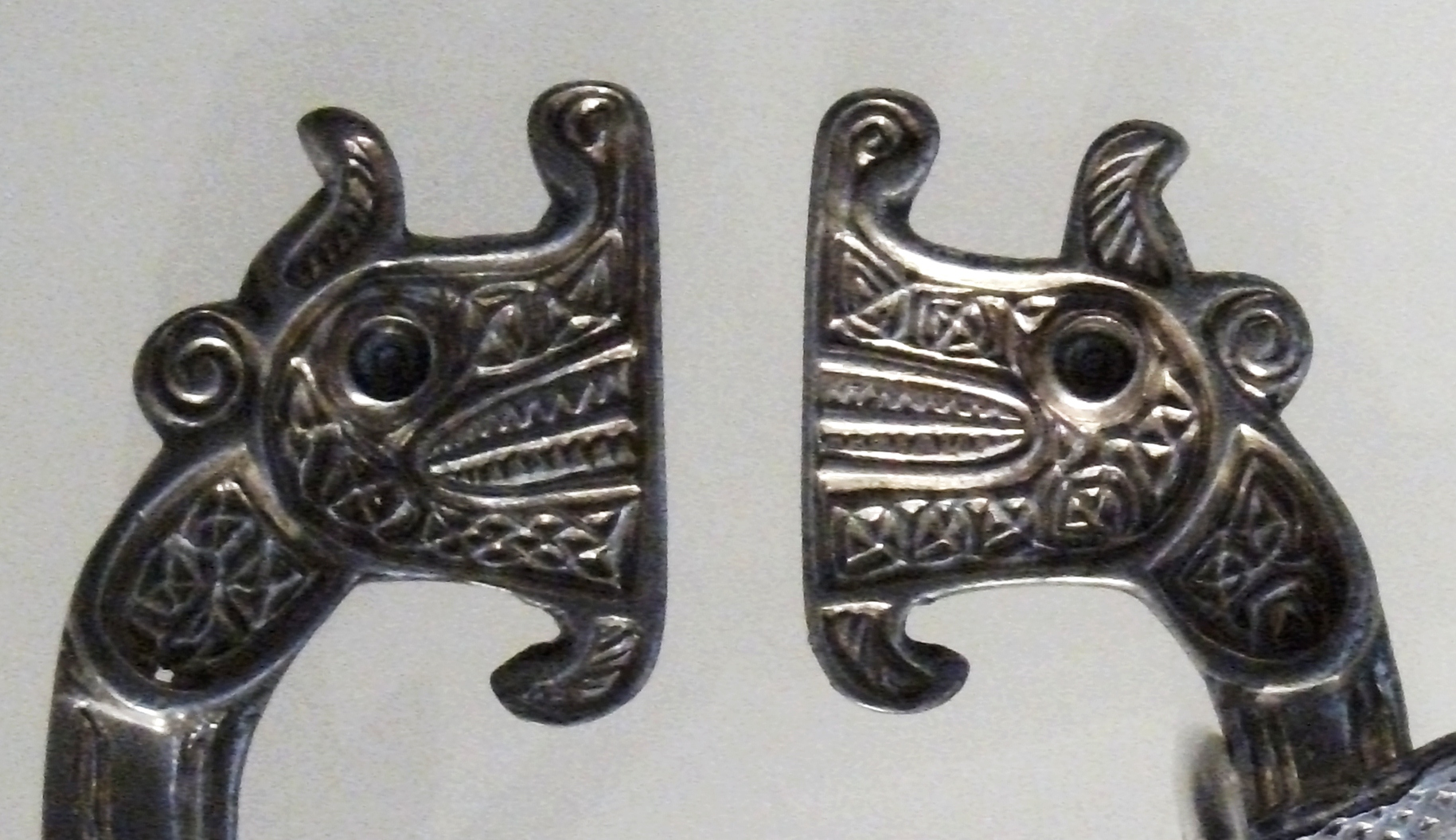
Pictish confronted animal terminals, St Ninian's Isle Treasure

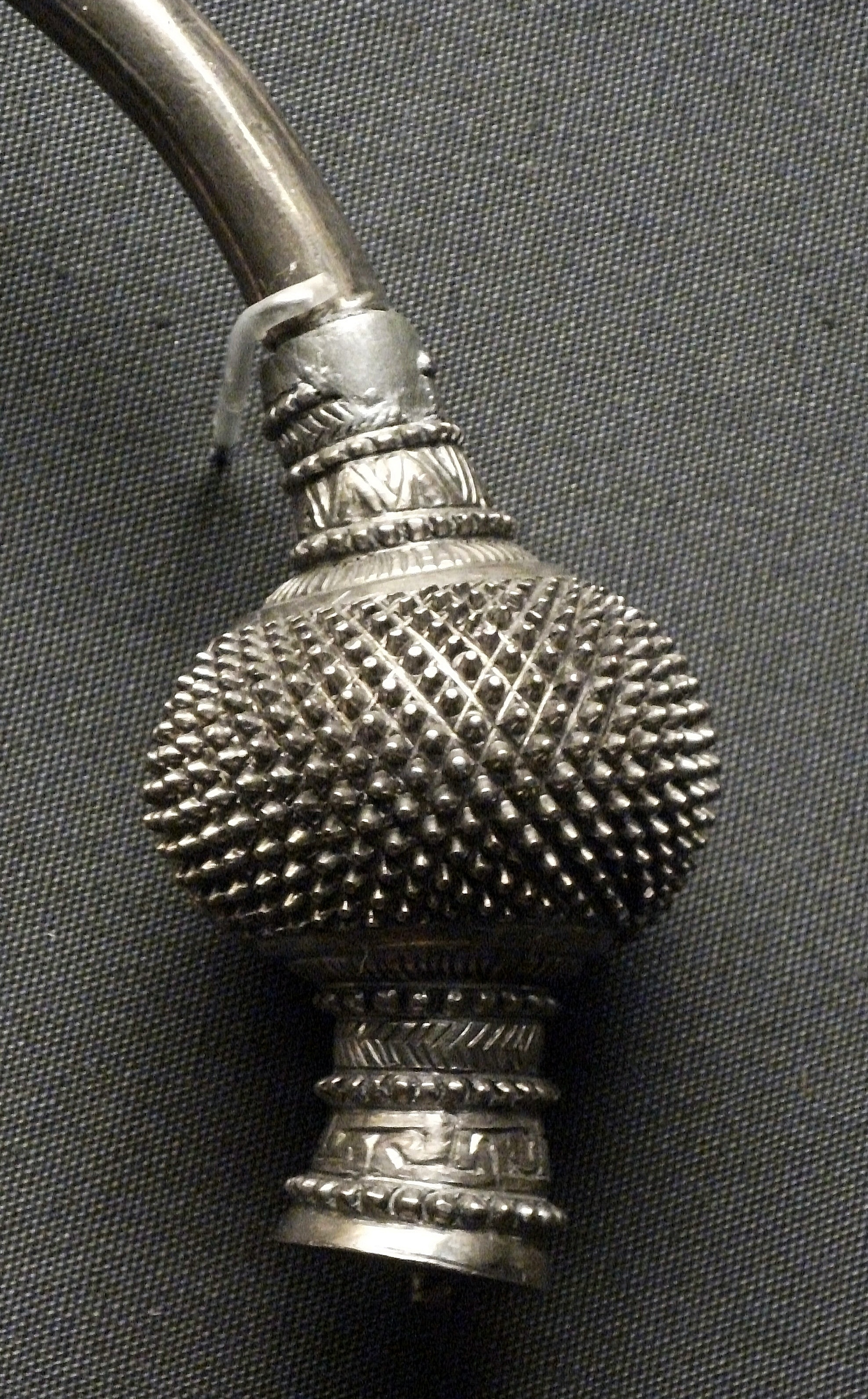
"Brambled" terminal on a thistle brooch

=== Later brooches, and the Vikings ===
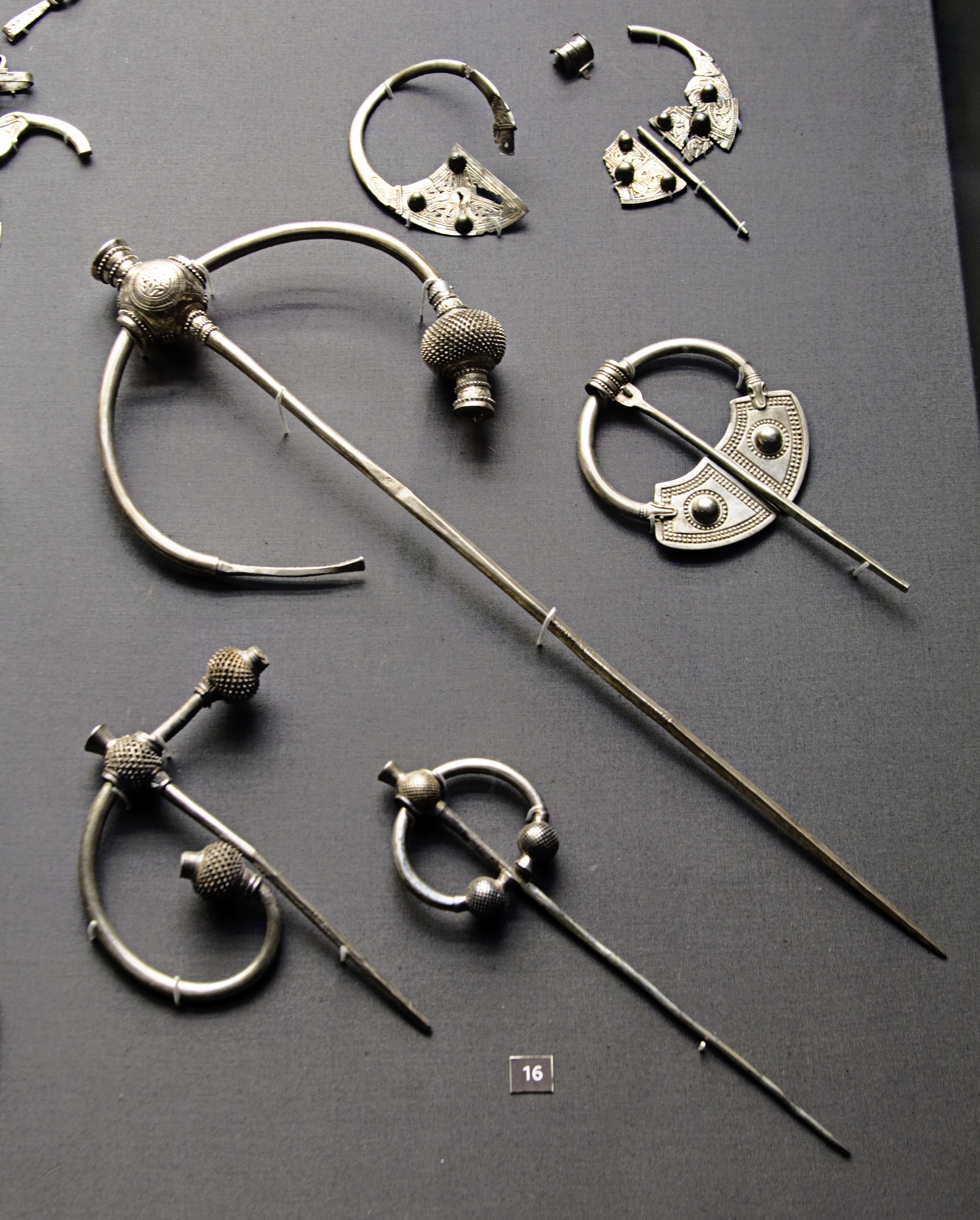
Viking period pennannular brooches from the Penrith Hoard, three of the "thistle" type.

The Vikings began to raid Ireland from 795, with catastrophic effect for the monasteries in particular. However, although the Vikings established several longphorts, initially fortified encampments for over-wintering, and later towns like Dublin, Wexford, Cork, and Waterford (the first real urban centres in Ireland), the native Irish were more successful than the English and Scots in preventing large-scale Viking takeovers of areas for settlement by farmers. By about the year 1000, the situation was relatively stable, with a mixed population of Norse-Gaels in the towns and areas close to them, while the Gaelic Irish, whose elite often formed political alliances, trading partnerships and inter-marriages with Viking leaders, remained in control of the great majority of the island, and were able to draw tribute from the Viking towns.

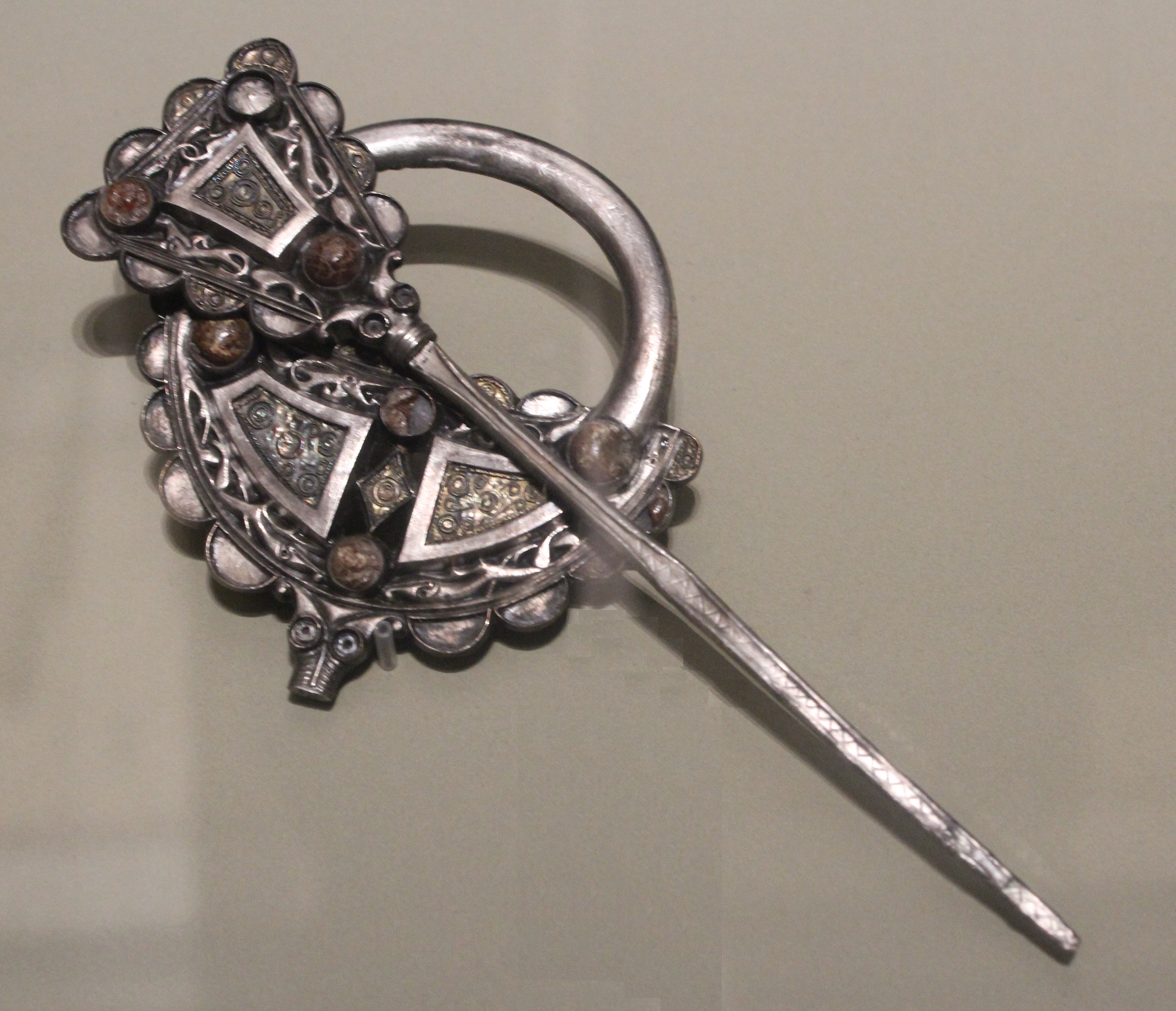
The Roscrea Brooch, 9th century. National Museum of Ireland

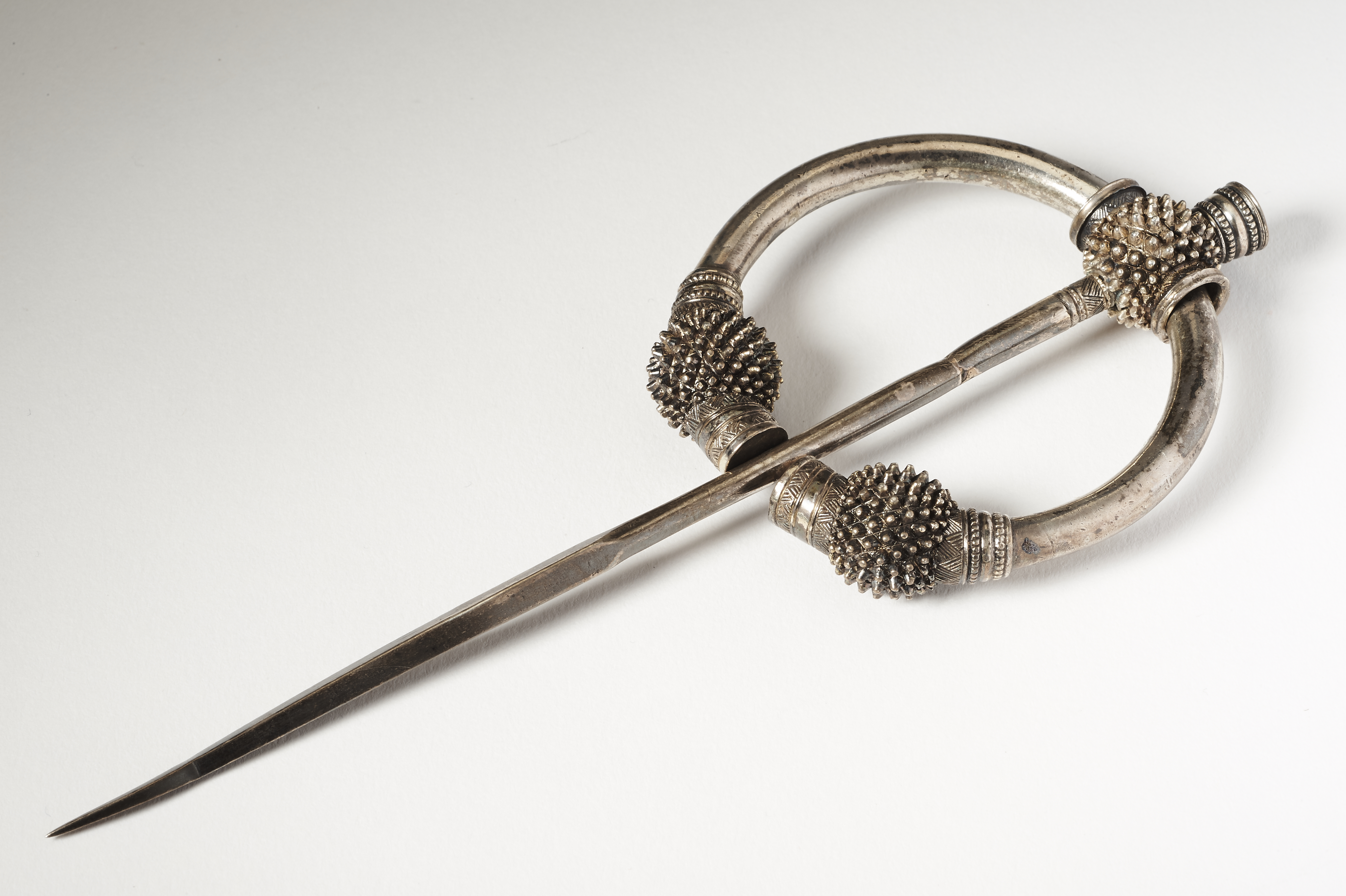
Silver brooch in thistle pattern, 9th-10th century AD. The Hunt Museum (Limerick, Ireland)

The period is characterised by a greatly increased availability of silver, presumably the result of Viking raiding and trading, and most brooches are made from silver throughout, as gilding and decoration in other materials nearly disappears. The brooches are often large and relatively massive, but plainer than the most elaborate earlier ones, neither using older local decorative styles nor the Viking styles that were adopted in other media. This continues a trend that can be detected in later brooches from the preceding period, before much Viking influence can have made itself felt. The 9th century Roscrea Brooch is one of a number of transitional brooches; though its form is highly ornate, with a large flat triangular pin head, the ring is thick plain silver, the gold filigree panels occupy relatively small areas, and their workmanship is a "coarse" or "crude" imitation of that of earlier works. The Kilamery Brooch is another ornate and high quality example, with a marked emphasis on plain flat silver surfaces. There are rare exceptions in which a highly decorated brooch shows Scandinavian stylistic and technical influence, notably an Irish brooch from Rathlin Island, with areas stamped where the Irish tradition would have used casting.

The brooches appear to have been made by "native" metalworkers, but worn by both Vikings and Gaels. The very popular thistle brooches have terminals and often pin-heads that are like thistle flowers, with a ball topped by a round projection, often flared; they are called by the term regardless of whether or not the ball is "brambled"—that is, formed with a regular pattern of small tapering projections, like the two lowest brooches from the Penrith Hoard illustrated here. These, and other globular endings to terminals and pin-heads, were common, but flattened terminals continued to be made, now ornamented by round silver bosses amid simple repeated patterns, or interlace that is larger in scale than in the earlier ornate badges. In these, the ring often ends in a "gripping beast" biting the terminal plate. The mixture of types seen in the 10th century Penrith Hoard is typical.

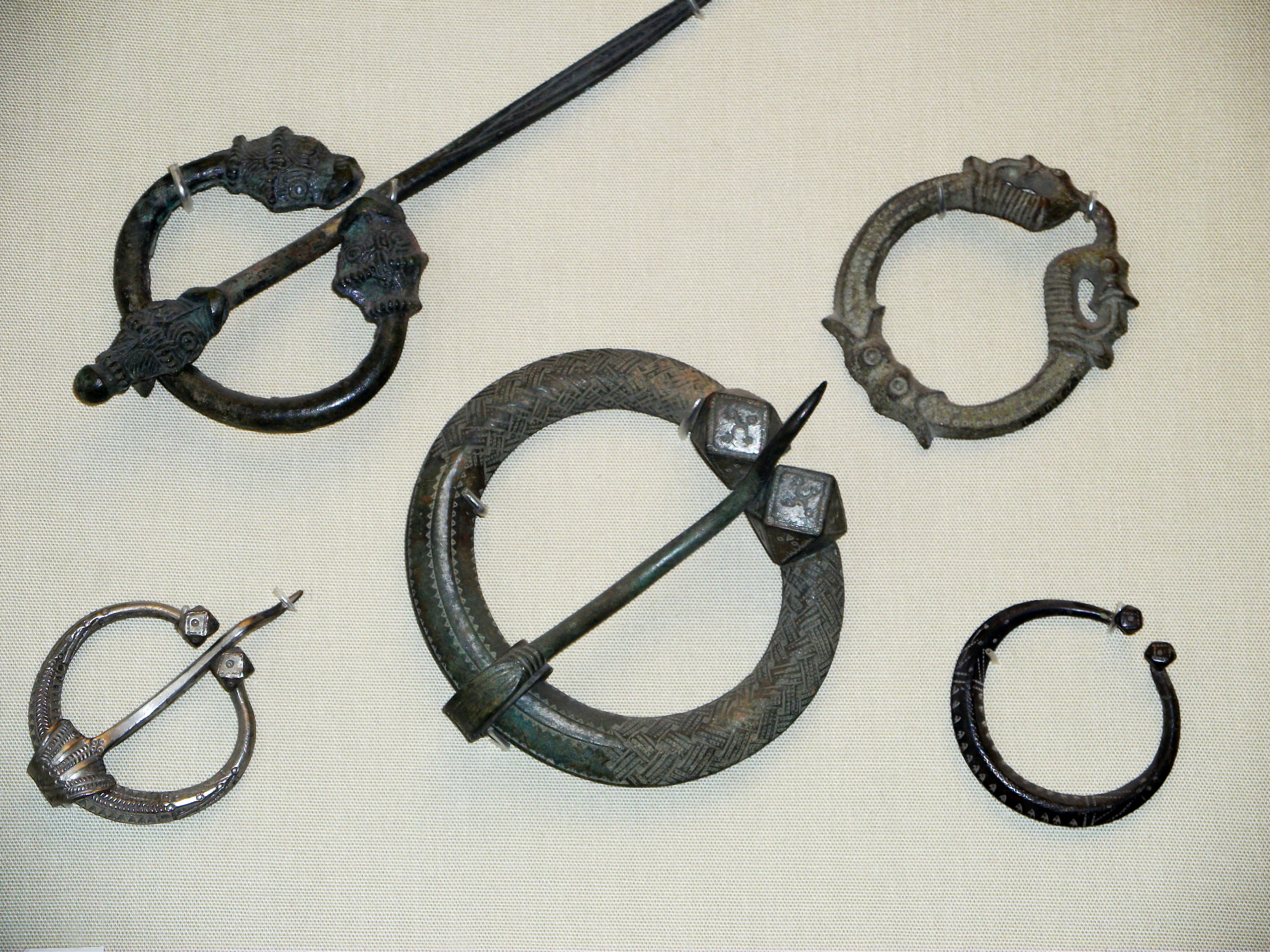
Brooches made in Scandinavia, mostly in base metal

Insular brooches had been taken back to Scandinavia, and began to be produced there in the 10th century for wearing singly by men at the shoulder; Viking women wore pairs of characteristic oval brooches on the upper breast. Most were simpler than Insular examples, and several hundred in "tinned bronze rather than silver" are known. The 10th century Danish Møllerløkken Brooch is the most elaborate example known, with a simple overall design with ball terminals and pin-head, but with rich detailing such as interlace panels on the ring and filigree sections on the balls. Other Insular types were also produced in Viking areas of England, especially Scandinavian York. The penannular brooch fell from common use by the end of the 11th century, a time when Ireland and Scotland, and Scandinavia, were adopting general Western European styles in many areas of both art and life.

A distinctly Irish type of brooch found at the end of the Viking period is the kite brooch, whose name derives from the almond shape called a "kite" in heraldry, though the shapes of the heads are actually highly variable. They were apparently worn, like the larger brooches, singly with the pin pointing upwards. Only "about half a dozen" exist in silver, including examples that are much larger than average, with pins up to 7.9 cm long. In these, there is no ring, but the elaborate head is connected to a pin of very variable length by a short tab of metal that can move on joints at both ends; there is also usually a cord for winding round the pin to secure it. Only 14 of these brooches have been found to date in Ireland, many incomplete, and none elsewhere; five of these are from Dublin, the earliest from the 940s. They appear for about a further two centuries; typical medieval ring brooches dated to after 1200 have few distinctively Irish characteristics.

=== Celtic Revival ===
The brooches we have today have been discovered since the 17th century, and their odds on their survival once found have increased greatly over that period, as their value as artefacts has overtaken their scrap value. In the 19th century, as part of the Celtic Revival, many brooches copying or inspired by earlier styles were made.

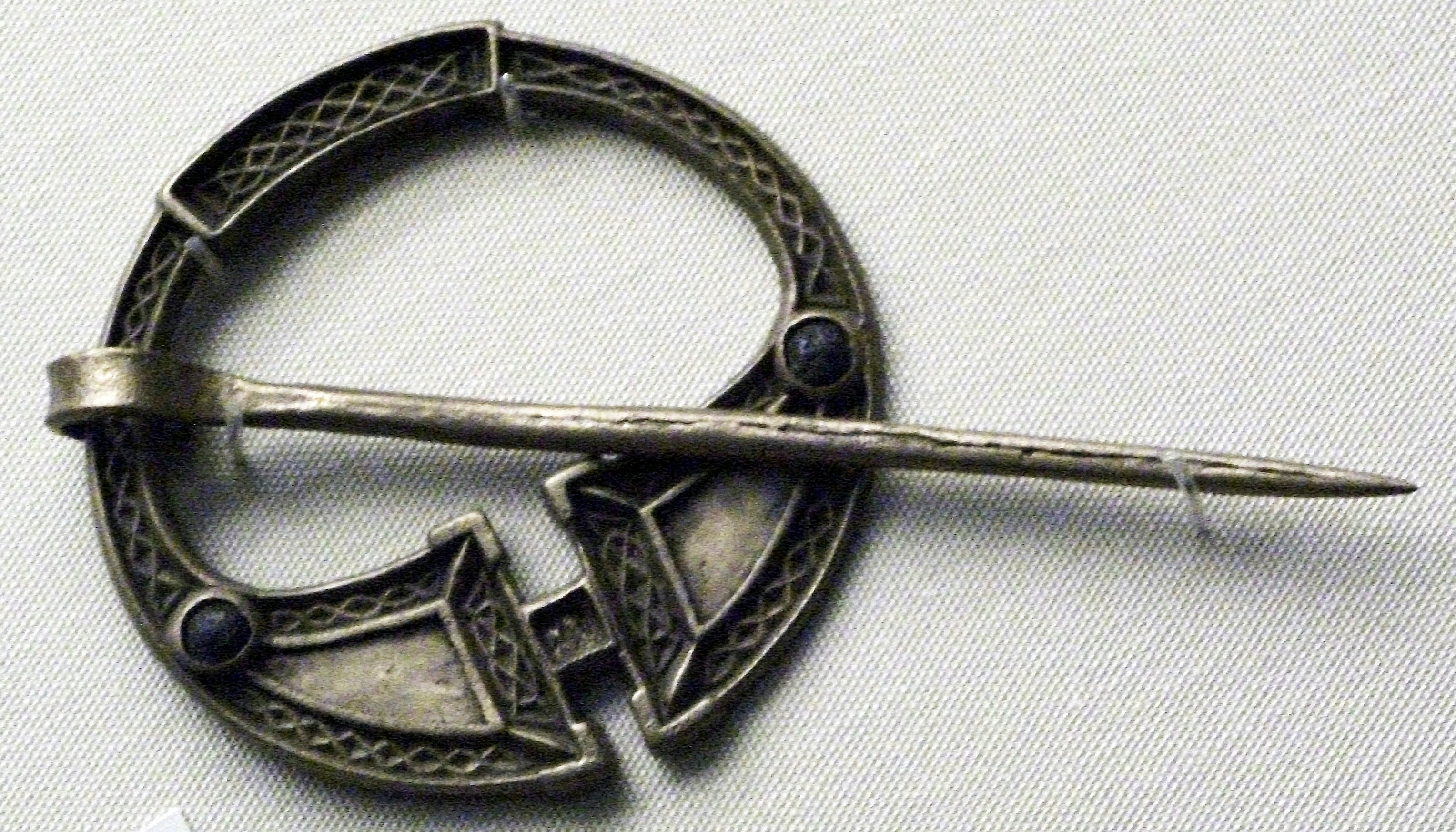
Early medieval Irish brooch, bronze and glass. The pin lies entirely in front of the ring in this example.

Much of the responsibility for the fashion for high-quality Celtic Revival jewellery belongs to George Waterhouse, a jeweller from Sheffield, England, who moved to Dublin in 1842. Before the end of the decade, he and the long-established Dublin firm West & Son of College Green (later moving to Grafton Street) were finding it necessary to register their designs to prevent copying. Of the various types of objects made, the brooches were both the "most resonant" and those which could be sold with the least alteration to the original form and design, although the jewellers generally reduced their size and fitted them with conventional pins and catches behind, even though the Kashmir shawls that were also fashionable at the time were often loosely woven and not unsuitable for fastening in the original way. Different versions were made at different price levels, though even the most expensive struggled to recreate the full intricacy of the originals.

The National Museum of Ireland is clearly not correct in saying that the fashion began after Queen Victoria was presented with a replica of the "Cavan Brooch" on her visit to Dublin to see the Great Industrial Exhibition in 1853; the Royal Collection has two brooches that Prince Albert bought for her from West & Son in 1849 on an earlier visit to Dublin, which were already being made in editions. Albert presented them in November and at Christmas that year: "...such beautiful souvenirs, both made after those very curious old Irish ornaments we saw in the College in Dublin, one a silver shawl brooch, in smaller size than the original" was her reaction to the November gift. A later gift from Albert included a setting of a cairngorm he had picked up when walking in the Scottish Highlands, a more authentic type of gem than the brightly coloured foreign stones used in much Celtic Revival jewellery.

The discovery of the Tara Brooch in 1850 could therefore not have been better timed in terms of attracting public interest. It was immediately recognised as the culminating masterpiece (though early in date) of the Irish development of large and superbly worked ornate brooches, a status it has retained ever since. The brooch was soon acquired by George Waterhouse, who used it as the centre of displays of his replicas and imitations of Celtic brooches in his Dublin shop, also exhibiting it at The Great Exhibition in London in 1851 and the Paris Exposition Universelle (1855), as well as the Dublin exhibition visited by the Queen in 1853 (Victoria had already seen it; it had been specially sent to Windsor Castle for her inspection).

Waterhouse had invented the brooch's name; in fact, it has nothing to do with the Hill of Tara, and while likely found some 28 km away the actual circumstances of its find still remain unclear (essentially to avoid a claim by the landowner), and Waterhouse chose to link it to the site associated with the High Kings of Ireland, "fully aware that this would feed the Irish middle-class fantasy of being descended from them". Describing the trend in the mid-20th century, Adolf Mahr described the tendency for giving brooches —and more importantly their replicas— such titles as "fanciful (and sometimes ridiculous)...by a firm of Dublin jewellers". By the time the Tara brooch passed to what is now the National Museum of Ireland in the 1870s, the "Tara brooch" had become a generic term for Celtic Revival brooches, some of which were now being made by Indian workshops for export to Europe.

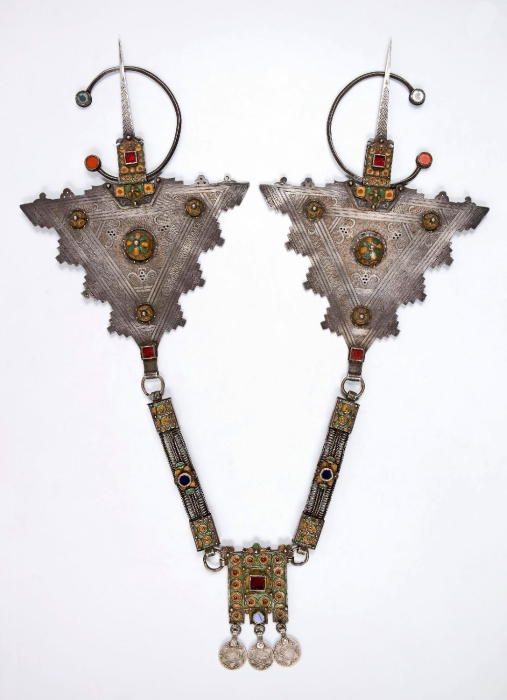
Berber or Amazigh fibulae from southern Morocco

== Maghreb region in North Africa ==
Penannular brooches are a characteristic type of Berber traditional silver jewellery, worn until the second half of the 20th century by Berber (endonym: Amazigh) women in the Maghreb. They were usually worn in symmetrical pairs and used to fix parts of unsewn draped garments, one to each side, with the pins pointing straight up. Traditionally made by Jewish silversmiths, some are plain and large brooches, not unlike some later Celtic or Viking examples, and other types have a very elaborately decorated triangular base to the pin, which can dwarf the ring. A heavy necklace often hangs between the two brooches, usually attached to a ring at the bottom of the brooch. Local names for the brooches are said to include melia, melehfa, bzima, kitfiyya, and khellala in Maghrebi Arabic, and tabzimt, tizerzay, and tazersit in Berber languages. As brooches similar in form and function are known from the Bronze Age and later Roman and Visigoth brooches, such fibulae are believed to have been in use in the Maghreb since ancient times.
