= Breadalbane Brooch =

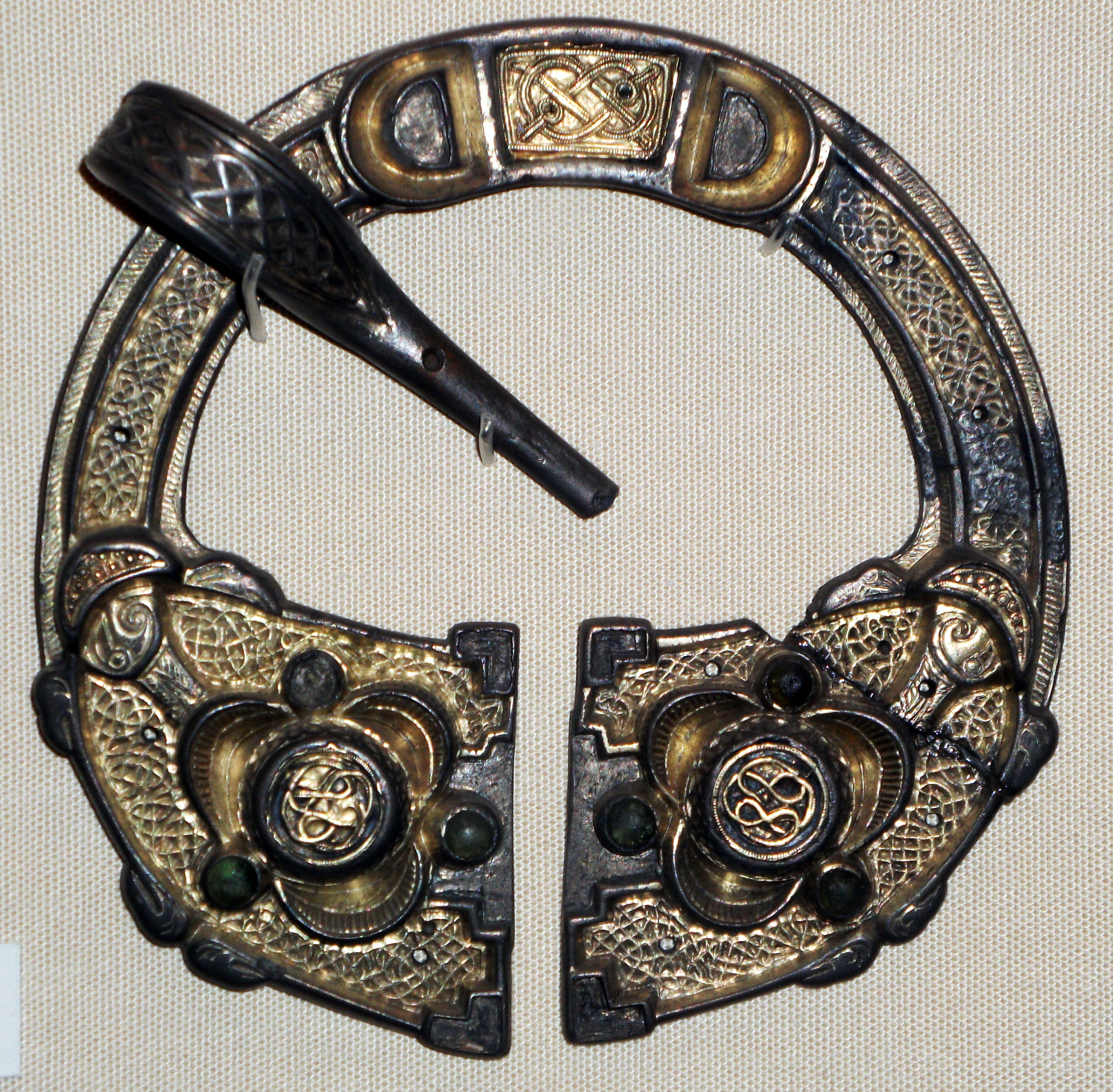
- Material: Silver, gilding, gold, glass
- Size: Diameter 9.8 cm; Weight 140.8 grams
- Created: 8th Century
- Place: Ireland, Scotland (pin)
- Present location: British Museum
- Identification: 1919,1218.1

The Breadalbane Brooch is a silver and gilt Celtic penannular brooch probably made in Ireland, but later altered and then found in Scotland. Probably dating to the 8th century, with 9th-century alterations, it is an intricately designed, silver-gilt dress fastener that is closely related to a select group of brooches that were produced in Ireland and Britain during the 'golden age' of late Celtic art. The brooch has been in the British Museum since 1919 and is normally on display.

== Description ==
The brooch and pin were cast in silver with exquisite geometric and zoomorphic interlace patterns and inset with three green-glass cabochon gems (one of which is missing). Several moulded sections were used; although the main ring was cast in one piece, other goldsmith's techniques were used in the decoration. both front and back were partially gilded, with gold and gold foil also used in parts of the decoration. There may have been inset pieces of amber, which are now missing. The right side has been broken and repaired three times. There is decoration on both front and back, in rather different styles, a feature also found in the

This is one of a number of brooches which were made in the Irish "pseudo-penannular" style, with the ring fully closed (like the two just mentioned and the Londesborough Brooch), but later adapted to a true penannular brooch by cutting away the bridging section linking the large terminals. The pin, which moves freely around the ring between the terminals (see other picture), is broken but would have originally extended to at least double the brooch's diameter. It appears to be a replacement, made in Scotland, probably at the same time that the form of the ring was adapted by cutting the bridge to make the brooch truly penannular.

== History of ownership ==
The design and manufacture of the brooch mixes Celtic and Pictish styles - it may originally have been a gift from an Irish dignitary to his Scottish counterpart, who later repaired or embellished the brooch according to local tastes. The original provenance of the brooch is unknown, although it is conjectured that the brooch was found in Perthshire in Scotland as it was probably first owned by Gavin Campbell, 1st Marquess of Breadalbane, whose country estate was located in that county. The brooch was later donated to the national collection by Sir John Ramsden, following the sale of the Breadalbane Collection in 1917.
