= Rogart Brooch =

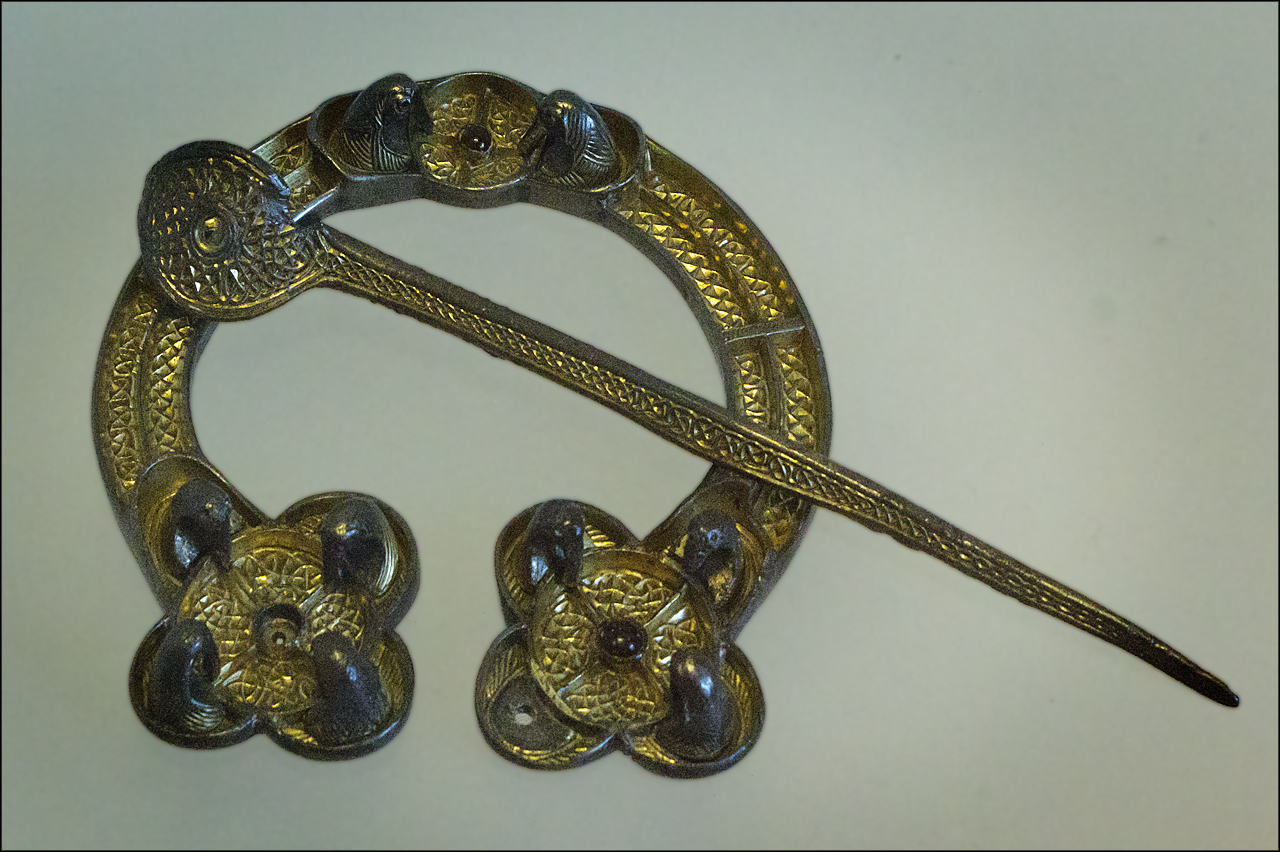
- Material: Silver-plated with gold, glass, amber
- Size: head diameter: 12 cm (4.7 in); pin length: 19.3 cm (7.6 in)
- Period/culture: 8th-century
- Place: Rogart, Sutherland, Scotland
- Present location: National Museum of Scotland
- Identification: NMS X.FC2

The Rogart Brooch is a large penannular brooch of Pictish origin, dated to the 8th-century. Characteristic of contemporary Pictish brooches, it contains three-dimensional bird-head inserts formed with glass.

It was discovered at Rogart, Sutherland, in Scotland in 1868 as part of a hoard of 8th-century brooches. The hoard was unearthed during rock-blasting for the construction of the Sutherland Railway. A workman found the collection of brooches in the earth uncovered by removing a large boulder. He immediately left his work and disappeared southwards, on the way passing two brooches to Mr Macleod, a shopkeeper in Cadboll, who displayed them to the Society of Antiquaries of Scotland in 1870. The number of brooches discovered in the hoard was not recorded at the time.

Both brooches are in the archaeology collection of the National Museum of Scotland. The Rogart Brooch, the larger of the two, is on permanent display in the museum in Edinburgh. A third brooch from the find went to the collection of the then Duke of Sutherland and later to Dunrobin Castle.

== Descriptions ==
=== Rogart Brooch ===
Drawing of one of the sipping birds heads, 1881

The brooch is made from a flat band of silver decorated with carved and alternating interlace patterns, some of which are in gold, and a head that is a quarter inch thick. The width of the head is 12 centimetres (4.7 inches), and the pin is 19.3 cm (7.6 in) long. The hoop is divided into four quadrants, each of which is decorated with interlace. The bird heads are rendered in full-relief, all inward-facing, fixed with rivets, lined with gold, with narrow eyes made from green glass. They are placed on both the upper band of the ring and the quadrants of each of the two cloverleaf-shaped terminals. The terminals are about 2.5 cm (1 in) apart, and separated from both the ring-head and each other by raised borders lined with gold.

The brooch is in relatively good condition; some of the settings for decorative studs in the head and terminals, made from red glass and amber, are missing. Its reverse is relatively flat and unembellished.

=== Smaller brooch ===
The smaller brooch is made from silver and is in poor condition, having lost all its glass studs. The width of the head is 7.7 cm (3.0 in), and the pin is 13.3 cm (5.2 in) long.

== Sources ==
- Anderson, Joseph (1881). Scotland in Early Christian Times (second Series). D. Douglas.
- Finlay, Ian (1999). Scottish Gold and Silver Work". Firebird Press. ISBN 9781565545595.
- Young, Susan, ed. (1989). The Work of Angels: Masterpieces of Celtic Metalwork, 6th—9th centuries AD. London: British Museum Press. ISBN 9780292790582.
- "Proceedings of the Society of Antiquaries of Scotland". Society of Antiquaries of Scotland, 1882. ISSN 0081-1564
