= Elizabeth Fowler (archaeologist) =

- Born: Elizabeth Burley; 1933
- Died: 2017
- Occupation: Archaeologist

Elizabeth Fowler was an archaeologist best known for her work on Iron Age and early medieval metalwork, particularly the 'Fowler Type' penannular brooch classification which bears her name. She also undertook fieldwork on Iona where she participated in the excavation of Tòrr an Aba at Iona Abbey.

== Education, early career and personal life ==
Fowler was born in London in 1933. As a child she attended Sherrardswood School in Welwyn Garden City. As a young woman she became interested in archaeology, which was still a quite young field that contained very few women. She won a place at Edinburgh University, where she was able to study archaeology. During this period, she catalogued and published the metalwork from the hillfort of Traprain Law, East Lothian, helping establish a rigorous chronology for the fort's occupation.

She was awarded a Carnegie Scholarship to pursue a masters degree at Edinburgh University, and joined a small team to undertake the first modern excavations at Iona Abbey in 1956. It was around this time she met Peter Fowler, who was at the time an undergrad at Oxford and "fellow proto-archaeologist." She transferred her graduate studies to Saint Anne's College in 1957. At Saint Anne's she was supervised by Christopher Hawkes in what would later become the Institute of Archaeology.

Her research on early Insular metalwork continued in these years. In 1961 she completed her B.Litt, entitled "The Historical Significance of Celtic Dark Age Metalwork". Her graduate work led to a series of publications establishing the classification of pennanular brooches known as the 'Fowler Types' which are still used today. However, pursuing a professional career in archaeology was not possible for Fowler because of gender barriers. Instead, she began to teach history in Wiltshire and later taught adult education classes in archaeology and history at the University of Bristol. Fowler continued to be involved in archaeology where she could, and for many summers she would record and organise finds from her husband's excavations.

In 1979 Fowler and her family moved to St Albans, where she began work as editor of the Magazine Popular Archaeology.

== Excavations on Iona ==
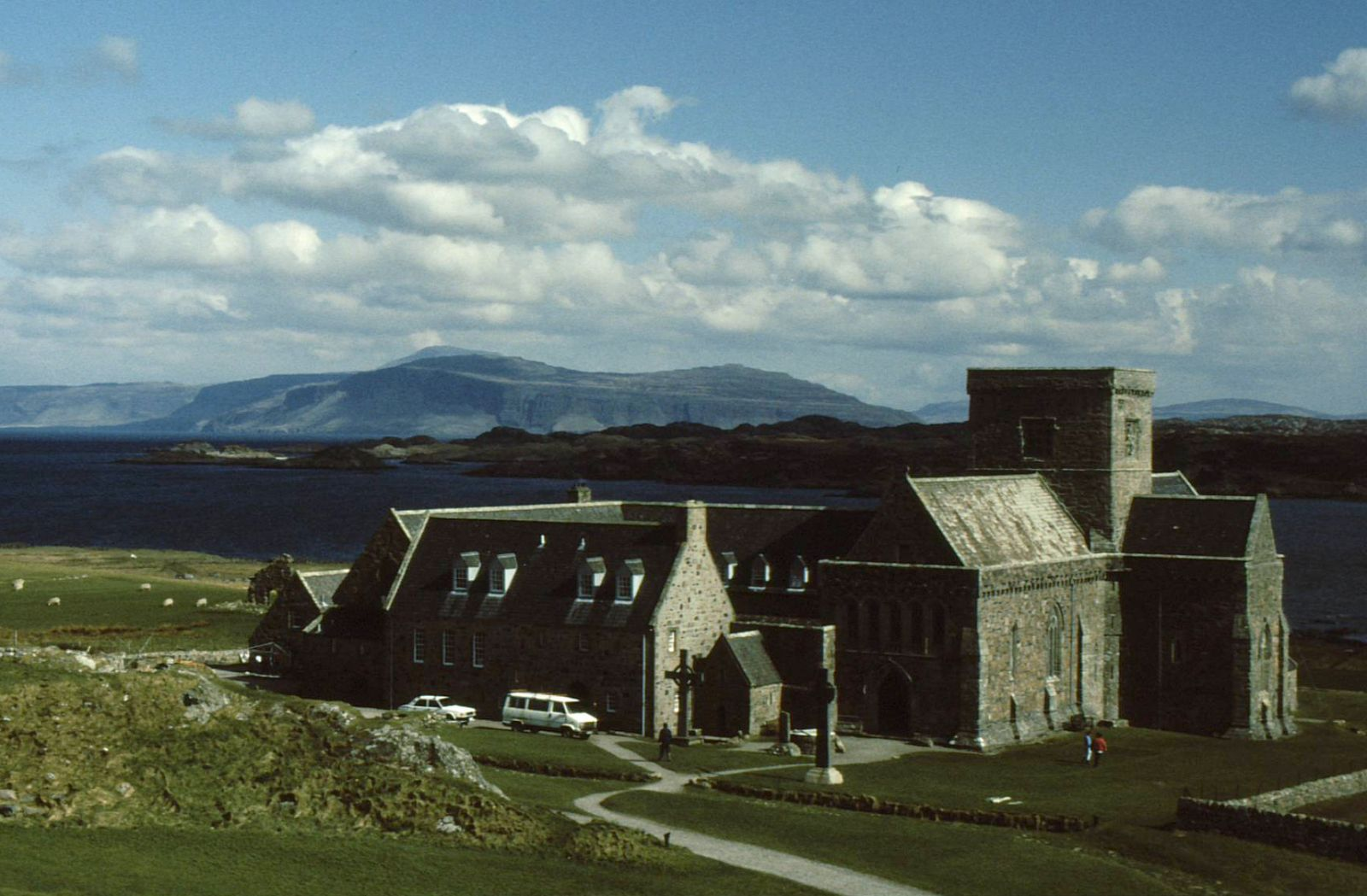
Iona Abbey with Tòrr an Aba visible in the foreground

Iona Abbey was supposedly the site of Saint Columba's writing hut; one of the main hagiographies of Saint Columba is Vita Sancti Columbae, written 697 C.E. by one of Columba's successors, Adomán. In this text Adomán provided a description of Columba's writing hut, which was the site of some of his miracles and prophetic visions. The hut is described as being located on a raised place, "looking east out over the Sound of Iona to the rocks of Mull." A rocky outcrop known as Tòrr an Aba, or the Mound of the Abbot, on the grounds of Iona Abbey.

In 1956-7, Elizabeth Fowler (then known by her birth name, Elizabeth Burley) and Peter Fowler undertook excavations of Tòrr an Aba as part of the campaign led by Charles Thomas. The first location that they investigated was Tòrr an Aba. There are antiquarian reports of a cross having stood on Tòrr an Aba, and the excavations uncovered the socket that the cross once stood in. During this excavation, the team noticed that the cross had been erected on top of an earlier structure. In 1957 this area was excavated, revealing the remains of a simple wattle hut with one or two stages of construction. The hut had burned, leaving a layer of charcoal and ash, which had been buried in pebbles. The stone cross was then constructed on top of the site of the hut. The excavations would not be published in Thomas's lifetime, but Elizabeth and Peter Fowler, having led this part of the excavation, took it upon themselves to publish this part of the site separately. They argued the remains of this structure could possibly be evidence of Columba's cell, though they could not prove it in the absence of radiocarbon dates.

Luckily, Thomas had retained the archive from the Iona excavations, and later bequeathed them to the former Historic Scotland who teamed up with archaeologists from the University of Glasgow to radiocarbon date the material and revisit the site of the excavation. The radiocarbon dating indicated that the hut dated to c 600 C.E., with a latest possible date for the charcoal of 650 C.E., meaning that it is likely that it was built around the time of St Columba and his successors, supporting the Fowlers' argument.

Fowler (as Burley) would go on to direct the 1958 season of excavations in the Abbey in Charles Thomas's absence, and remained part of the team through the 1959 season. In a later reassessment of the excavations, it was observed that her 1958 excavations "seem to have been recorded to a better standard than most of the other trenches."

== Selected publications ==
Burley, E. (1956) ‘A catalogue and survey of the metal-work from Traprain Law’, Proceedings of the Society of Antiquaries of Scotland, 89: 118–226.

Fowler, E. (1960) ‘The origins and development of the penannular brooch in Europe’, Proceedings of the Prehistoric Society 26: 149–177.

Fowler, E. (1963) ‘Celtic metalwork of the fifth and sixth centuries A.D. A re-appraisal’, Archaeological Journal 120: 98–160.

Fowler, E. (1980) Earlier Medieval Sites (410 - 1066) in and around Bristol and Bath, the South Cotswolds, and Mendip. Bristol: Bristol Archaeological Research Group (Field Guide No. 3A).

Fowler, E. (1983a) ‘A fragment of an enamelled bronze bowl from Bradley Hill, Somerton, Somerset’, in A. O’Connor and D.V. Clarke (eds), From the Bronze Age to the ’Forty-five: studies presented to R B K Stevenson. Edinburgh: John Donald, pp. 237–242.

Fowler, E. and Fowler, P.J. (1988) ‘Excavations on Tòrr an Aba, lona, Argyll’, Proceedings of the Society of Antiquaries of Scotland 118: 181–201.
