= A History of Ireland in 100 Objects =

Project defining objects important to the history of Ireland

A History of Ireland in 100 Objects was a joint project by The Irish Times, the National Museum of Ireland, and the Royal Irish Academy to define one hundred archaeological or cultural objects that are important in the history of Ireland. The objects are single man-made artefacts or documents, excluding buildings, ranging in date from about 5,000 BC (Mesolithic) to the early 21st century. Most of the objects are held in accessible collections in the Republic of Ireland or Northern Ireland.

Details of the hundred objects, written by Irish Times journalist Fintan O'Toole, were initially serialized in The Irish Times between February 2011 and January 2013. In February 2013 a book about the hundred objects written by O'Toole, entitled A History of Ireland in 100 Objects, was published, and it quickly became a best-seller with 35,000 free downloads.

In January 2017 An Post announced that a selection of the 100 objects would form the subjects for the 9th definitive postage stamp series for Ireland, to be issued over a period of five or six years from 2017. The first set of stamps featuring twelve of the objects were issued in January 2017, consisting of eight different SOAR (Stamps on a Roll) stamps with various values (€0.05 to €7.50), a range coil stamps, and a national (N) and an international (W) rate stamp booklet.

== List of objects ==
Objects for which there is a specific Wikipedia article are given in bold type.

Image	Number	Object	Date	Location	Postage stamp	Reference
	1	Mesolithic fish trap	c. 5000 BC	National Museum of Ireland – Archaeology, Dublin	Set 1, 2017 (SOAR)	
	2	Ceremonial axehead	3600 BC	National Museum of Ireland – Archaeology	Set 1, 2017 (SOAR)	
	3	Neolithic bowl	c. 3500 BC	National Museum of Ireland – Archaeology	Set 1, 2017 (SOAR)	
	4	Flint macehead	3300–2800 BC	National Museum of Ireland – Archaeology	Set 1, 2017 (SOAR)	
	5	Neolithic bag	3800–2500 BC	National Museum of Ireland – Archaeology		
	6	Basket earrings	c. 2300 BC	National Museum of Ireland – Archaeology		
	7	Pair of gold discs	2200–2000 BC	National Museum of Ireland – Archaeology	Set 1, 2017 ('N' rate)	
	8	**Coggalbeg gold hoard**	2300–2000 BC	National Museum of Ireland – Archaeology	Set 1, 2017 (SOAR)	
	9	Bronze Age funerary pots	1900–1300 BC	National Museum of Ireland – Archaeology	Set 1, 2017 (SOAR)	
	10	Tara torcs	c. 1200 BC	National Museum of Ireland – Archaeology	Set 1, 2017 (SOAR)	
	11	**Mooghaun hoard**	c. 800 BC	National Museum of Ireland – Archaeology, and British Museum		
	12	**Gleninsheen gorget**	c. 800–700 BC	National Museum of Ireland – Archaeology	Set 1, 2017 ('W' rate)	
	13	Castlederg bronze cauldron	700–600 BC	National Museum of Ireland – Archaeology	Set 1, 2017 ('N' rate)	
	14	Iron spearhead	800–675 BC	National Museum of Ireland – Archaeology		
	15	**Broighter boat**	c. 100 BC	National Museum of Ireland – Archaeology	Set 1, 2017 (SOAR)	
	16	**Old Croghan Man**	362–175 BC	National Museum of Ireland – Archaeology	Set 1, 2017 ('N' rate)	
	17	Loughnashade horn	c. 100 BC	National Museum of Ireland – Archaeology		
	18	**Keshcarrigan bowl**	early-1st century	National Museum of Ireland – Archaeology		
	19	The **Corleck Head**	1st to 2nd century	National Museum of Ireland – Archaeology		
	20	Petrie crown	2nd century	National Museum of Ireland – Archaeology		
	21	**Cunorix stone**	460–75	In situ		
	22	St Patrick's Confessio	c. 460–90	Trinity College, Dublin		
	23	Mullaghmast stone	500–600	National Museum of Ireland – Archaeology		
	24	**St Patrick's bell**	c. 7th century	National Museum of Ireland – Archaeology		
	25	**Springmount wax tablets**	late-6th century	National Museum of Ireland – Archaeology		
	26	**Ballinderry Brooch**	c. 600	National Museum of Ireland – Archaeology		
	27	Donore handle	700–20	National Museum of Ireland – Archaeology		
	28	**Book of Kells**	c. 800	Trinity College		
	29	**Tara brooch**	8th century	National Museum of Ireland – Archaeology		
	30	**Ardagh chalice**	8th century	National Museum of Ireland – Archaeology		
	31	**Derrynflan paten**	late-8th century	National Museum of Ireland – Archaeology		
	32	**Moylough Belt-Shrine**	8th or 9th century	National Museum of Ireland – Archaeology		
	33	**Rinnegan Crucifixion Plaque**	8th or 9th century	National Museum of Ireland – Archaeology		
	34	Tall cross	late-9th century	Monasterboice, County Louth		
	35	Oseberg ship	c. 815	Museum of Cultural History, Oslo, Norway		
	36	**Ballinderry sword**	mid-9th century	National Museum of Ireland – Archaeology		
	37	Decorated lead weights	c. 900	National Museum of Ireland – Archaeology		
	38	**Roscrea Brooch**	late-9th century	National Museum of Ireland – Archaeology		
	39	Slave chain	late-9th or early-10th century	National Museum of Ireland – Archaeology		
	40	Silver cone	mid-10th century	National Museum of Ireland – Archaeology		
	41	Carved crook	early-11th century	National Museum of Ireland – Archaeology		
	42	**Breac Maodhóg**	late-11th century	National Museum of Ireland – Archaeology		
	43	**Clonmacnoise Crozier**	11th century	National Museum of Ireland – Archaeology		
	44	**Cross of Cong**	early-12th century	National Museum of Ireland – Archaeology		
	45	'Strongbow's tomb'	12th century	Christ Church Cathedral, Dublin		
	46	**Laudabiliter papal bull**	1155	National Library of Ireland, Dublin		
	47	Figure of a horseman	13th century	National Museum of Ireland – Archaeology		
	48	**Domhnach Airgid**	c. 1350	National Museum of Ireland – Archaeology		
	49	**Waterford charter roll**	1215–1373	Medieval Museum, Waterdord		
	50	Two coins	1280s and 1460	National Museum of Ireland – Decorative Arts and History		
	51	Processional cross	1479	National Museum of Ireland – Archaeology		
	52	Magi Cope	c. 1470	Medieval Museum, Waterdord		
	53	De Burgo-O'Malley chalice	1494	National Museum of Ireland – Decorative Arts and History		
	54	Kavanagh charter horn	12th and 15th centuries	National Museum of Ireland – Archaeology		
	55	Gallowglass gravestone	15th or 16th century	Gaelic Athletic Association Museum, Dublin		
	56	Book of Common Prayer	1551	Royal Irish Academy, Dublin		
	57	Salamander pendant	c. 1588	Ulster Museum, Belfast		
	58	Morion	late-16th century	National Museum of Ireland – Decorative Arts and History		
	59	Leac na ríogh	10–15th century	Near Cookstown, County Tyrone		
	60	Wassail bowl	late-16th century	Ulster Museum, Belfast		
	61	Deposition on atrocities	1641	Trinity College		
	62	O'Queely chalice	1640	National Museum of Ireland – Decorative Arts and History, Dublin		
	63	Fleetwood cabinet	c. 1652	National Museum of Ireland – Decorative Arts and History (now National Gallery of Ireland)		
	64	**Books of Survey and Distribution**	mid-17th century	National Archives of Ireland, Dublin		
	65	King William's gauntlets	c. 1690	National Museum of Ireland – Decorative Arts and History		
	66	Crucifixion stone	1740	National Museum of Ireland – Decorative Arts and History		
	67	Conestoga wagon	18th century	Ulster American Folk Park, County Tyrone		
	68	Wood's halfpence	1722	National Museum of Ireland – Decorative Arts and History		
	69	Dillon regimental flag	1745	National Museum of Ireland – Decorative Arts and History		
	70	Rococo candlestick	c. 1745	National Museum of Ireland – Decorative Arts and History		
	71	Engraving of linen-makers	1782	Ulster Museum, Belfast		
	72	Cotton panel	1783	National Museum of Ireland – Decorative Arts and History		
	73	Pike	1798	National Museum of Ireland – Decorative Arts and History		
	74	Act of Union blacklist	early-19th century	National Library of Ireland		
	75	Penrose decanter	late-18th century	National Museum of Ireland – Decorative Arts and History		
	76	Robert Emmet's ring	1790s	National Museum of Ireland – Decorative Arts and History		
	77	Wicker cradle	19th–20th centuries	National Museum of Ireland – Decorative Arts and History		
	78	Daniel O'Connell's 'chariot'	1844	Caherdaniel, County Kerry		
	79	Stokes 'tapestry'	1833–53	National Museum of Ireland – Decorative Arts and History		
	80	'Captain Rock' threatening letter	1842	National Library of Ireland		
	81	Empty cooking pot	19th century	National Museum of Ireland – Country Life		
	82	Emigrant's teapot	late-19th–mid-20th century	National Museum of Ireland – Country Life, County Mayo		
	83	William Smith O'Brien gold cup	1854	National Museum of Ireland – Decorative Arts and History		
	84	Parnell silver casket	1844	National Museum of Ireland – Decorative Arts and History		
	85	Carlow Cathedral pulpit	1899	Carlow County Museum, County Carlow		
	86	Youghal lace collar	1906	National Museum of Ireland – Decorative Arts and History		
	87	Gaelic Athletic Association medal	1887	National Museum of Ireland – Decorative Arts and History		
	88	Reclining Buddha	late-19th century	National Museum of Ireland – Decorative Arts and History		
	89	Titanic launch ticket	May 1911	Ulster Folk and Transport Museum, County Down		
	90	River Clyde lamp	1915	National Museum of Ireland – Decorative Arts and History		
	91	James Connolly's shirt	1916	National Museum of Ireland – Decorative Arts and History		
	92	Rejected coin design	1927	National Museum of Ireland – Decorative Arts and History		
	93	Boyne coracle	1928	National Museum of Ireland – Country Life		
	94	Eileen Gray chair	1926	National Museum of Ireland – Decorative Arts and History		
	95	Emigrant's suitcase	1950s	National Museum of Ireland – Country Life		
	96	Washing machine	1950s	Irish Agricultural Museum, County Wexford		
	97	Bloody Sunday handkerchief	1972	Museum of Free Derry, Derry		
	98	Intel microprocessor	1994	National Science Museum at Maynooth, County Kildare		
	99	Anglo Irish Bank sign	2000–2011	National Museum of Ireland – Decorative Arts and History		
	100	Decommissioned AK-47	2005	National Museum of Ireland – Decorative Arts and History		

== See also ==
- A History of the World in 100 Objects
