= Roscrea Brooch =

9th-century Irish brooch

Roscrea brooch
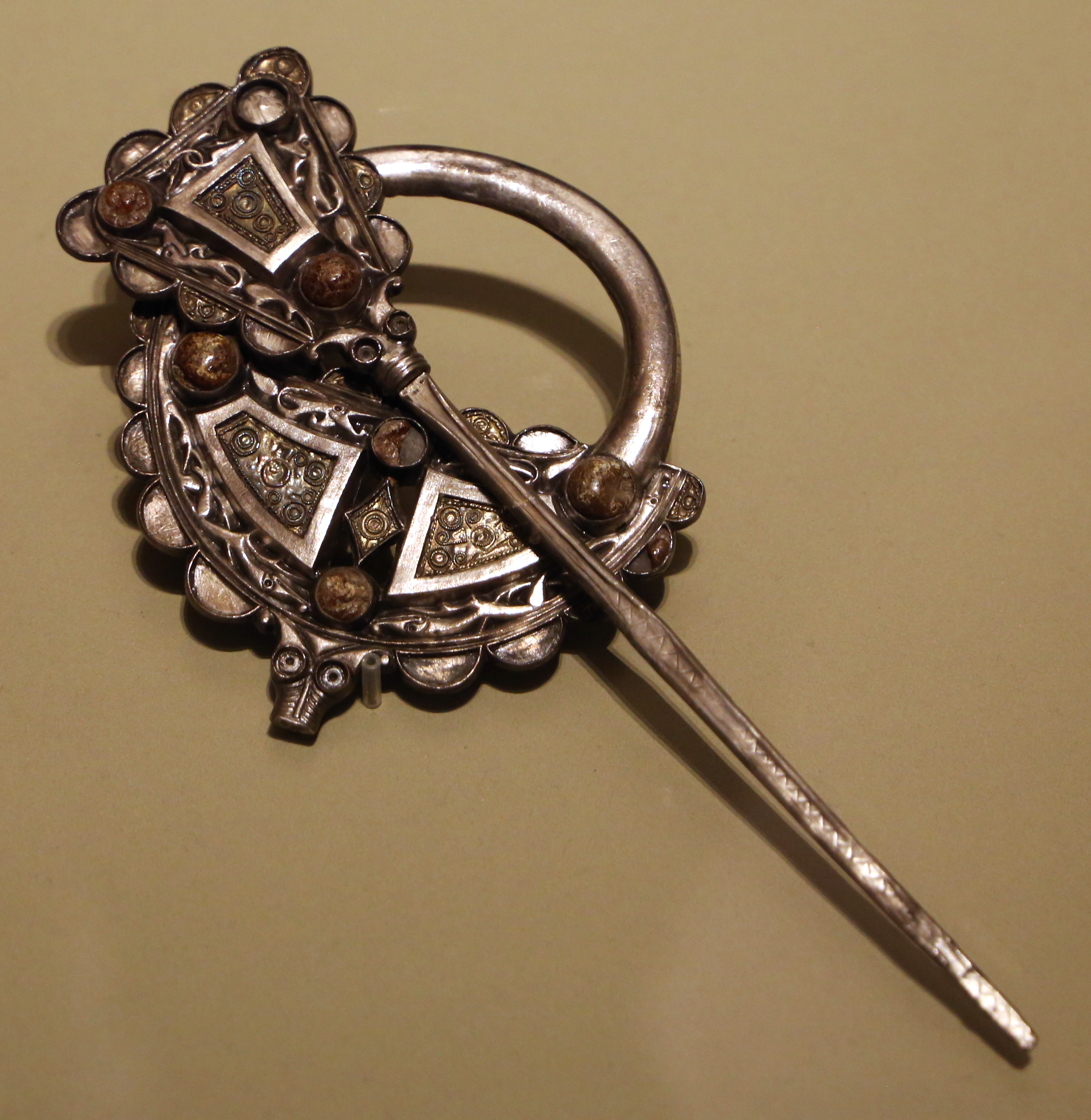
- Front view
- Material: silver, amber, gold filigree
- Size: Height 9.5 cm (3.7 in); Width 8.3 cm (3.3 in); Depth 0.6 cm (0.24 in)
- Created: (early?) 9th century
- Discovered: c. 1829; Roscrea, County Tipperary, or nearby
- Present location: National Museum of Ireland, Dublin
- Identification: NMI P.737

The Roscrea brooch is a 9th-century Celtic brooch of the pseudo-penannular type, found at or near Roscrea, County Tipperary, Ireland, before 1829. It is made from cast silver, and decorated with zoomorphic patterns of open-jawed animals and gilded gold filigree, and is 9.5 cm (3.7 in) in height and 8.3 cm (3.3 in) wide. The silver is of an unusually high quality for Irish metalwork of the period, indicating that its craftsmen were both trading materials with settled Vikings, who invaded the island in the preceding century, and had absorbed elements of the Scandinavians' imagery and metalwork techniques.

It was rediscovered in the 1820s and was in the possession of the artist and antiquarian George Petrie in 1850, until acquired in 1867 by the Royal Irish Academy, Dublin, following his death the previous year. Although not considered as innovative or significant as near-contemporary examples such as the Tara Brooch, it is formed from unusually high-quality material, including first-grade silver and linings of amber, which was very difficult to source in Ireland at the time.

Replicas of the brooch became popular during the mid-19th-century Celtic Revival, some of which are of very high quality. Despite the loss of some of its bosses, it is in overall good condition. The brooch is held in the collection of the National Museum of Ireland, Dublin.

== Dating ==
The brooch is variously dated as from the early (Mitchell) to late (O'Toole/NMI) 9th century. Writing in 1983, the historian Michael Ryan gave a probable dating of the mid to late-9th century, and Henderson notes that its zoomorphic iconography has parallels with Scottish designs of that period.

The brooch, the 8th-century Book of Dimma found at Roscrea Abbey and the Stowe Missal from the nearby village of Lorrha, indicate the relative prosperity of the town during the period. In 1993, the historian Orna Somerville noted how, by the 8th century, brooch rings such as the current example and those found in the Hill of Tara and at Killamery, "had ceased to be functional and was primarily a vehicle for elaborate decoration".

== Description ==
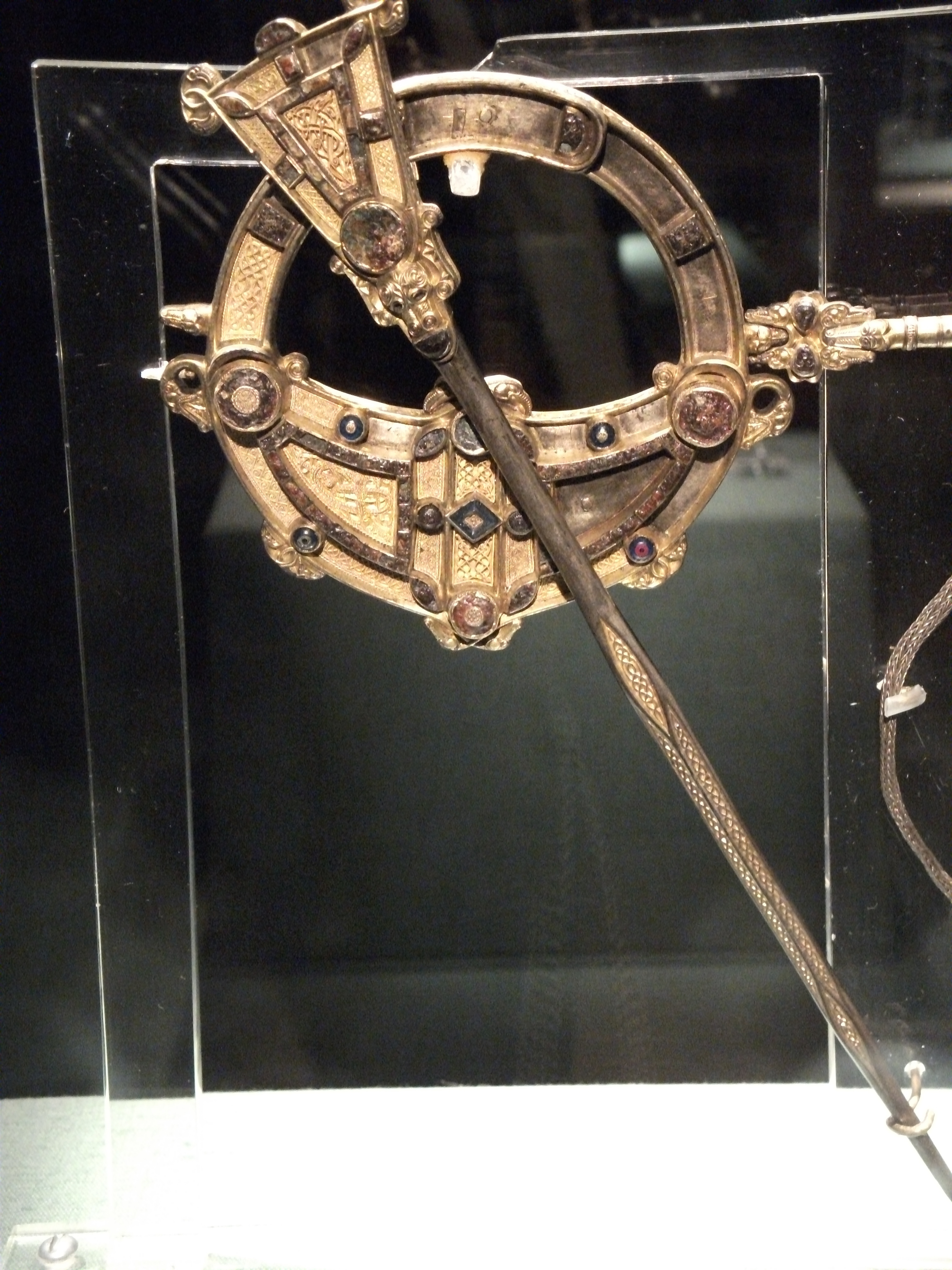
The similar formatted but more highly detailed Tara Brooch, 710–750 AD

The brooch is of the pseudo-penannular type (i.e. the ring is fully closed, but has two separately defined terminals). It weighs 122.85 grams, and is 9.5 cm high and 8.3 cm wide, and is made from cast silver, amber and gold. The brooch has an overall lozenge shape, with a large, flat, triangular head and a crest of rounded compartments decorated with gold filigree. The 8 cm long pin emerges through the mouth of a basal animal, and is attached to both the front and back sides of the plate. The pinhead contains pairs of concentric relief rings decorated with filigree. Both the pinhead and plate are decorated with rows of dots. The three main panels are also decorated with filigree. The outer edges of the terminals contain a pair of animals separated by an amber stud on the terminal's outer edges. Their bodies are co-joined from the area around their tails, a motif also found in a brooch found in Derryloughan, County Tyrone and in the 8th- or 9th-century Derrynaflan Chalice.

Its depictions of animals are of both the Tara (c. 710–750 AD) type and the 9th-century Killamery Brooch, and it is thus considered to be a transitional work between these two periods. The animals are in places open-jawed, and generally are positioned in rectangular panels and given rounded, ribbon-like bodies.

Only three of the seven large hemispherical amber bosses (raised circular ornamental studs) are intact; one is lost, and three are badly damaged. It originally had twenty-four in-filled D-shaped panels, of which, according to historian Niamh Whitfield: "eleven were D-shaped amber studs alternating with filigree, except at the top of the pinhead, where all four D-shaped panels contained filigree. Of these D-shaped amber studs, however, a fragment of just one survives at the edge of the right terminal."

Although its design is not as refined or sophisticated as other contemporary Irish brooches and has been described as "crude" compared to the similar Tara Brooch, the Roscrea Brooch is highly ornate. Its material is of very high quality. In 2013, it was described by the writer Fintan O'Toole as "distinctively Irish" when he selected it for his book A History of Ireland in 100 Objects, co-published by the Irish Times and Royal Irish Academy. O'Toole wrote that the object's "abstract patterns and elongated animals are typical of basic forms of Irish visual art" and that "there is as much continuity here as there is innovation."

The influence of contact with recent Viking invaders is evident in two ways, most notably in the high-quality silver used in its composition, which would have been very difficult to source locally. In addition, amber could only be sourced from Scandinavia or the Baltic region, and is rarely found in Irish metalwork before the 9th century. Both these facts indicate that its workmen were able to trade with the invading Norsemen. In addition, a number of large bosses contain Viking-influenced designs, including depictions of thistles.

== Find-spot and provenance ==
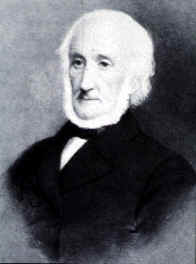
George Petrie (1790–1866). Portrait by Bernard Mulrenin

It was in the possession of the artist, antiquarian and artefact dealer George Petrie by 1850. A number of recent historians, including Stephen Briggs, doubt Petrie's claim that the find-spot was in Roscrea town and suspect Petrie sought to increase the object's market value. According to Briggs, Petrie had profited from selling copies of the brooch during the 1850s Celtic Revival boom that saw high demand for Irish ornaments. Briggs claimed that Petrie was "unfussy about his acquisitions’ provenances and that during the 1850s he appeared willing to invent an appropriate find-spot for his brooch, probably to help market its replicas", although he clarifies that Petrie was a "meticulous scholar whose abilities and research practices are not here in question". Most historians do however believe it was at least found in a location not far outside Roscrea, although Briggs speculates that it is the same brooch mentioned in an 1829 newspaper article which mentions a similarly described brooch recently discovered alongside a hoard of coins in Rathkeale, located some 100 km from Roscrea.

It was acquired in 1867 by the Royal Irish Academy, Dublin, as part of a larger purchase of Petrie's entire collection, following his death the previous year. It is today on permanent display in the Treasury room of the National Museum of Ireland in Dublin.
