= Tara Brooch =

Irish Celtic brooch

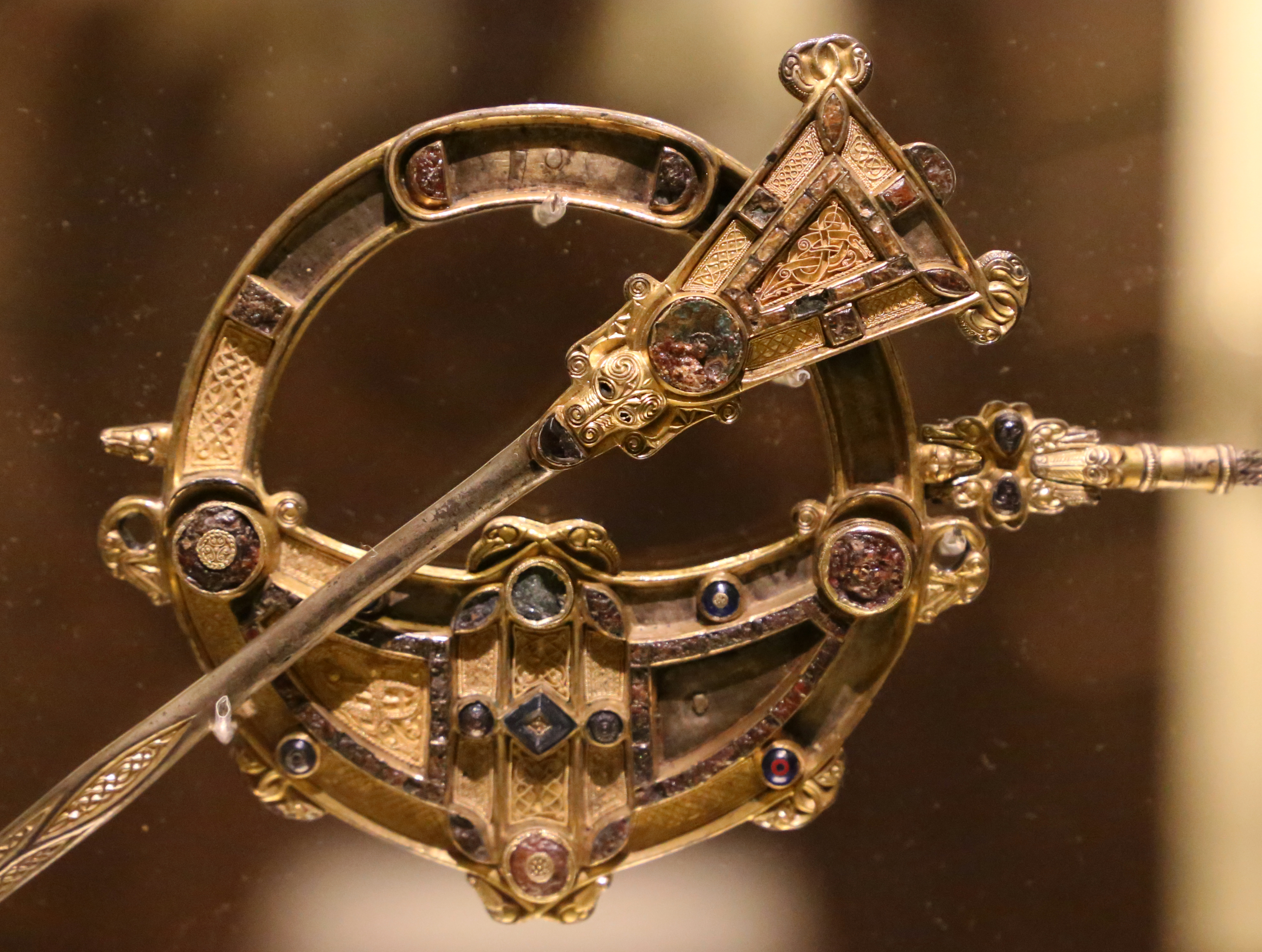
- Material: silver, gold, glass, enamel, amber, copper
- Size: diameter: 8.7 cm (3.4 in), length: 32 cm (13 in)
- Weight: 224.36 g (7.914 oz)
- Created: late-7th or early-8th century
- Discovered: 1850 (reportedly); Bettystown
- Present location: National Museum of Ireland, Dublin
- Identification: NMI, R. 4015

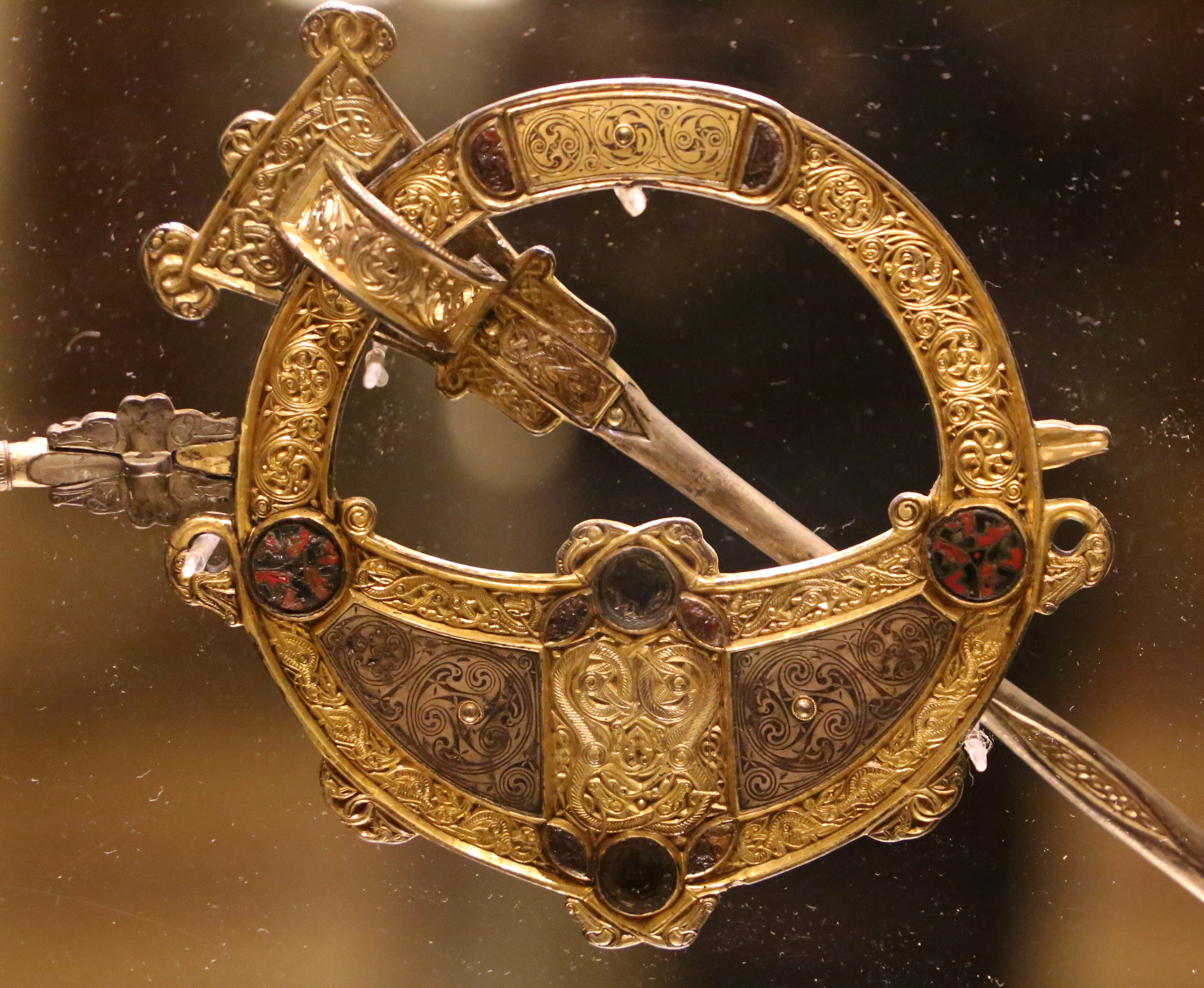
Reverse of the brooch

The Tara Brooch is an Irish Celtic brooch, dated to the late 7th or early 8th century. It is of the pseudo-penannular type (with a fully closed head or hoop), (Note: Penannular translates from Latin as "almost (paene) circular (annular)". In these brooches the hoop contains a gap to allow the pin to pass through it for fastening.) and made from bronze, silver and gold. Its head consists of an intricately decorated circular ring, and overall, its front and reverse sides are equally decorated; each holds around 50 inserted cast panels packed with filigree. The brooch was constructed from numerous individually made pieces; all of the borders and terminals contain multiple panels holding multi-coloured studs, interlace patterns, filigree, and Celtic spirals. It is widely considered the most complex and ornate of its kind, and would have been commissioned as a fastener for the cloak of a high-ranking cleric or as ceremonial insignia of high office for a High King of Ireland.

The Tara Brooch was hidden on the east coast of Ireland sometime during the 11th or 12th century, most likely to protect it from Viking or Norman invaders. It was rediscovered around 1850, but the exact find-spot and circumstances are unclear. Despite its title, it was not found at the Hill of Tara but on or near the beach around Bettystown on the coast of County Meath. The name by which it became known was chosen by its first commercial owner, the Dublin-based jeweller George Waterhouse, as a marketing ploy for selling copies during the height of the 19th century Celtic Revival. For this reason, many art historians describe it with inverted commas as the "Tara" brooch.

Its decoration and ornamentation are so detailed and minute that parts can only be fully seen using magnification, leading to a 19th-century critic writing that it was "more like the work of fairies than of human beings". Art historians see only the contemporary Hunterston Brooch (c. 700 AD) as an equal in craftsmanship and design. The archaeologist Niamh Whitfield called it "the most ornate and intricate piece of medieval jewellery ever found in Ireland", while the NMI describes it as representing "the pinnacle of early medieval Irish metalworkers’ achievement". It was acquired by the Royal Irish Academy in 1868, and transferred to the National Museum of Ireland in 1890, where it remains on permanent display.

== Function ==
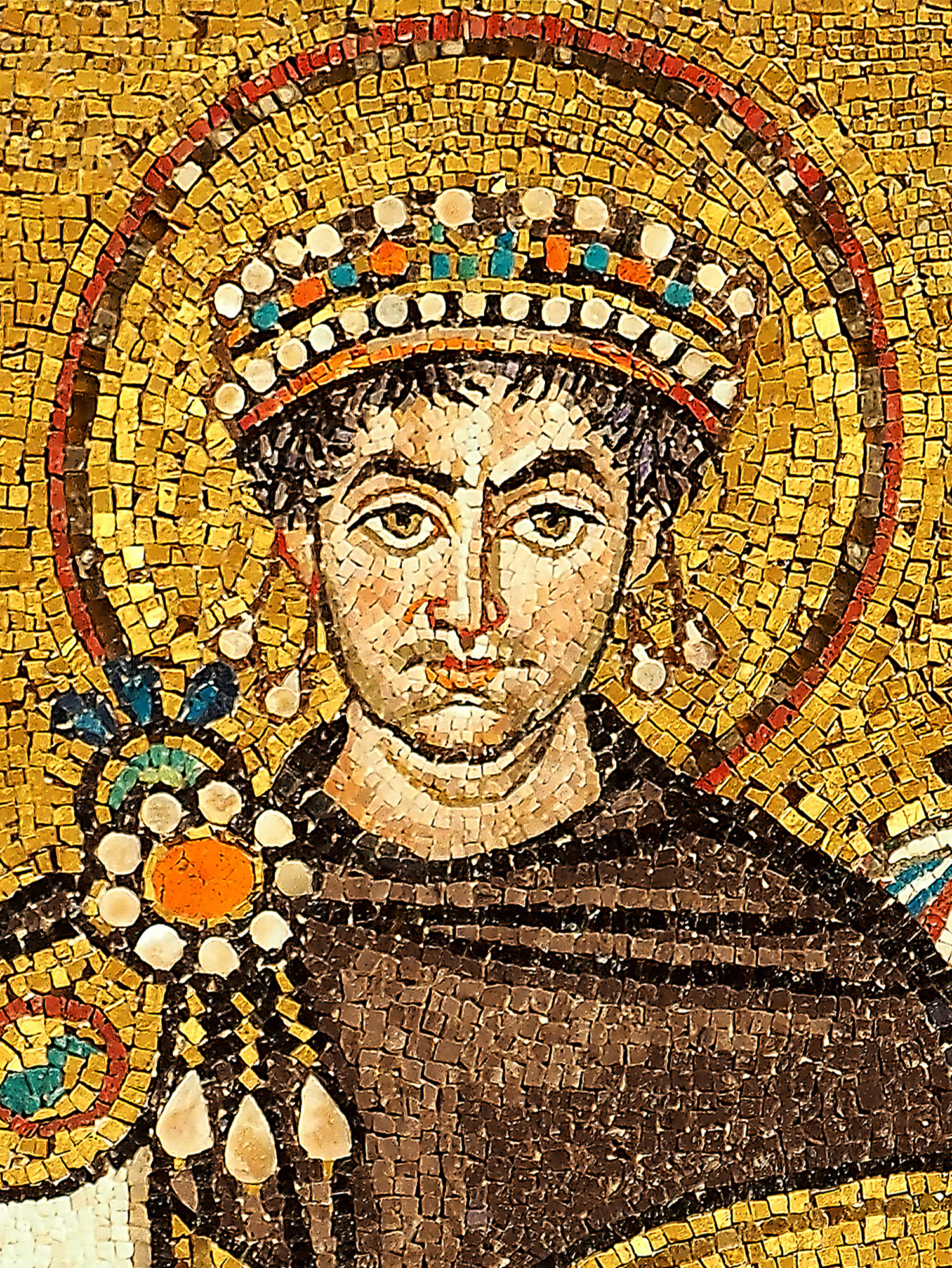
Detail of a 6th century mosaic of Justinian I, Basilica of San Vitale

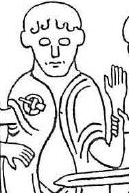
Sketch of a figure wearing a brooch. From an Irish High cross

The Tara brooch was likely made for a High King of Ireland or a dignitary or cleric, probably from the Kingdom of Brega, a branch of the Uí Néills, who ruled over much of today's Leinster. The owner would have worn it on ceremonial occasions. Gilt and silver zoomorphic brooches were status symbols in Early Medieval Ireland and Britain. The format is derived from the earlier tradition of torcs and gorgets (both types of neck-rings). By the 7th century, Irish kings had adopted the late Roman Empire use of brooches to fulfil this purpose. The tradition continued into the Byzantine empire; mosaics in the Basilica of San Vitale show the emperor Justinian (b. 482) wearing a brooch on an imperial purple cloak. Fully-sealed brooches were fashioned by rotating the pin within the gap by 90 degrees.

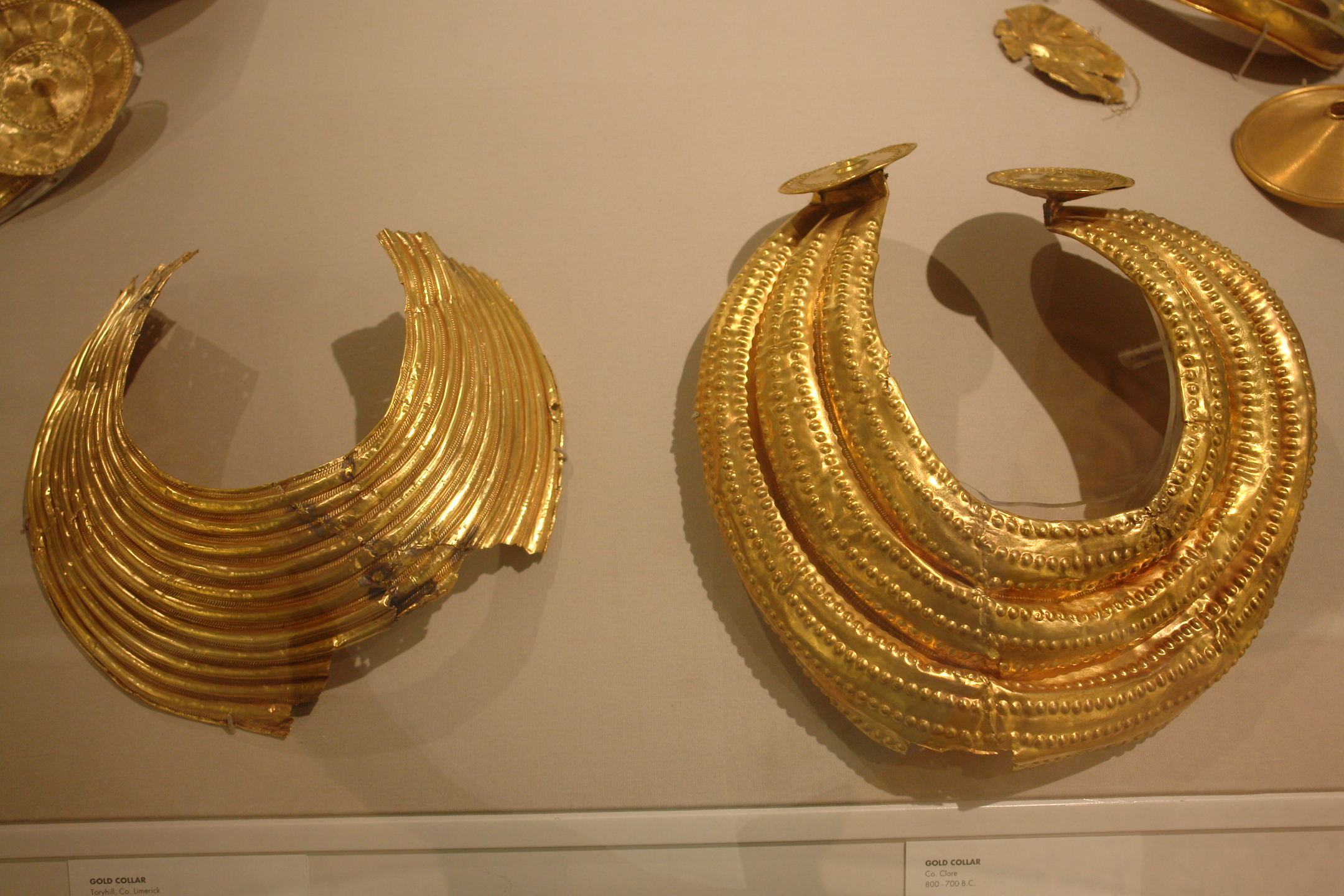
Gorgets on display at the NMI

Penannular brooches were too small to have been pushed through cloth. Instead, they were likely fixed in place by pushing the pin-shaft through the cloth, and fastened horizontally behind the head with stitches running through loops on the borders, and further secured by wrapping the chain around the pin.

Depictions in illuminated manuscripts indicate that high-quality brooches were often placed over purple dye cloaks (brait in Gaelic) just below the right shoulder. (Note: At the time, women would have worn brooches more centrally and lower, at the breast.) Positioning them below the right shoulder was another tradition that originated with the Romans, whose military placed it there to keep their cloak on the left and not impede access to their sword.

== Dating ==
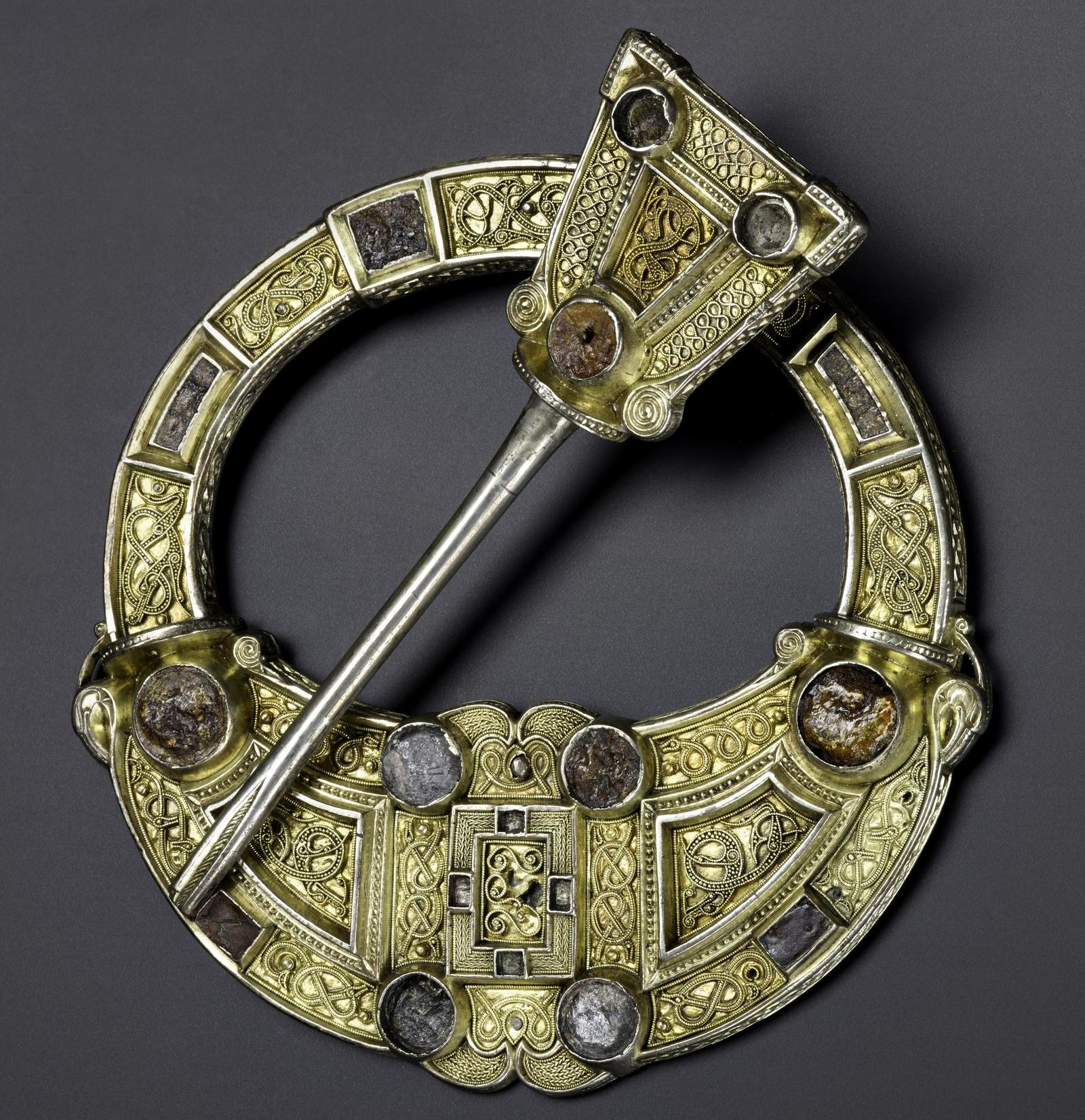
The Hunterston Brooch, silver mounted with gold, silver and amber decoration. c. 700 AD

Penannular brooches appear in Ireland from the 5th century, presumably made by craftsmen working in Roman Britain traditions. Surviving Irish brooches became more elaborate than Anglo-Saxon examples from the mid-9th century. The extant Irish examples have silver rather than bronze bases, as well as more decorated pinheads, a wider variety of inlay material such as red gold, amber, enamel, millefiori and glass, and larger terminals which had become the focal point for decoration. Goldsmithing was a prominent craft in prehistoric Irish society. Through the 7th century trade and missionary contacts with Anglo-Saxon, Frankish and Lombardic cultures, Irish craftsmen developed sophistication in goldwork and adopted the style sometimes referred to by historians as "Hiberno-Saxon" or "late Celtic".

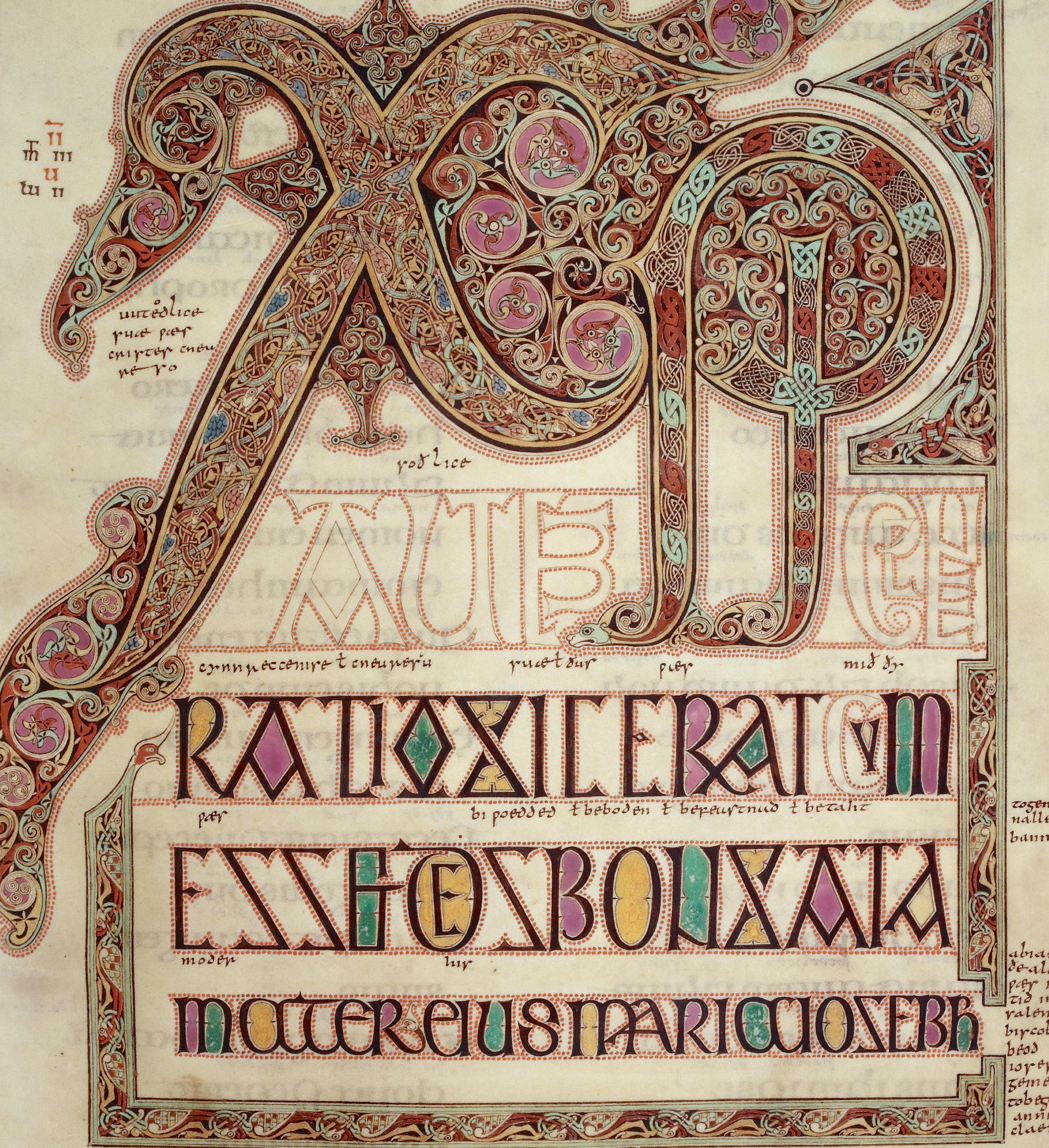
Monogram from the Lindisfarne Gospels, c. 715–720

The Tara brooch is usually dated to the late 7th or early 8th century, based on technical analysis and stylistic comparisons, in particular to its similarities to the Hunterston Brooch, produced in either Ireland or western Scotland at the turn of the 8th century, and the Lindisfarne Gospels made in Northumberland in the early 8th century. (Note: The Hunterston Brooch is similarly dated to this period based on its stylistic and technical similarities to the Lindisfarne Gospels.) In the late 19th century, the antiquarian Margaret Stokes was the first to observe that the use of trumpet spirals places it at least at the end of the so-called "Golden Age" of Insular art, given that the design had fallen out of use by 1050. Common elements between the Hunterston and Tara brooches and the Lindisfarne Gospels include curvilinear patterns and renderings of animals and birds in interlace. Archaeologists believe the workshops behind these objects were in contact with each other and sharing techniques and design ideas.

The Irish style drew influence from Anglo-Saxon formats and the chip carving and inlay methods of Germanic polychrome jewellery. In addition, by the 7th century, Irish missionaries had become exposed to Central European and Mediterranean cultures. Whitfield has noted that Ireland was then relatively outward-looking and cosmopolitan – compared to the later Middle Ages – and that "it is not surprising that it should have produced jewels which reflected European fashions".

== Description ==
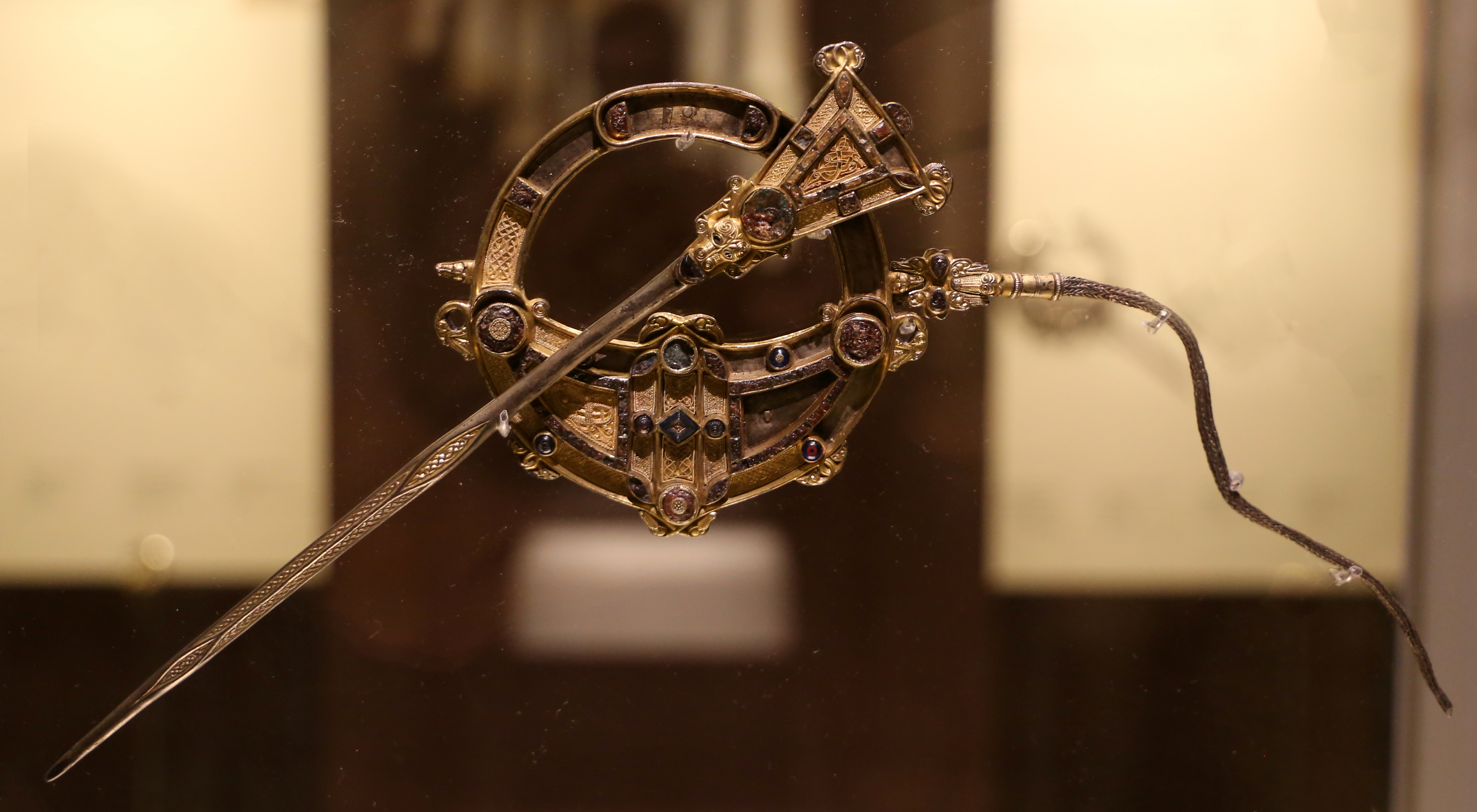
General view of the front side

The Tara Brooch is widely considered the most elaborately constructed and highly decorated extant Insular object, whose metalwork exceeds in richness of ornamentation both the 8th-century Ardagh and early 9th-century Derrynaflan chalices It is older than both and one of the earliest Insular metalwork pieces to depict animals in the zoomorphic style. It is far larger than most other Celtic brooches: the hoop has a maximum diameter of 8.7 cm (3.4 in) while the pin is 32 cm (13 in) in length.

The brooch is classified as pseudo-penannular because its terminals are closed and do not contain a gap for a fastening pin to pass through. It is bilaterally symmetrical with a basic structure consisting of a circular hook, semi-circular and linked terminals, and a long pin and a string likely used for additional support to keep it in place against the wearer's cloth. Although its core is made of silver, its surface is so highly gilded that the silver is barely visible.

It is composed of many individually formed pieces, with most of its filigree decorations inserted into small trays. Eighteen of these inserts survive, out of a total of twenty-eight trays. The complex geometry of its many designs and patterns includes concentric and ancillary circles, rectangular inserts, and an outline likely planned with sketches made with a compass on parchment. This is all the more likely, given the high number of detailed and complex patterns condensed into tiny spaces.

=== Head ===
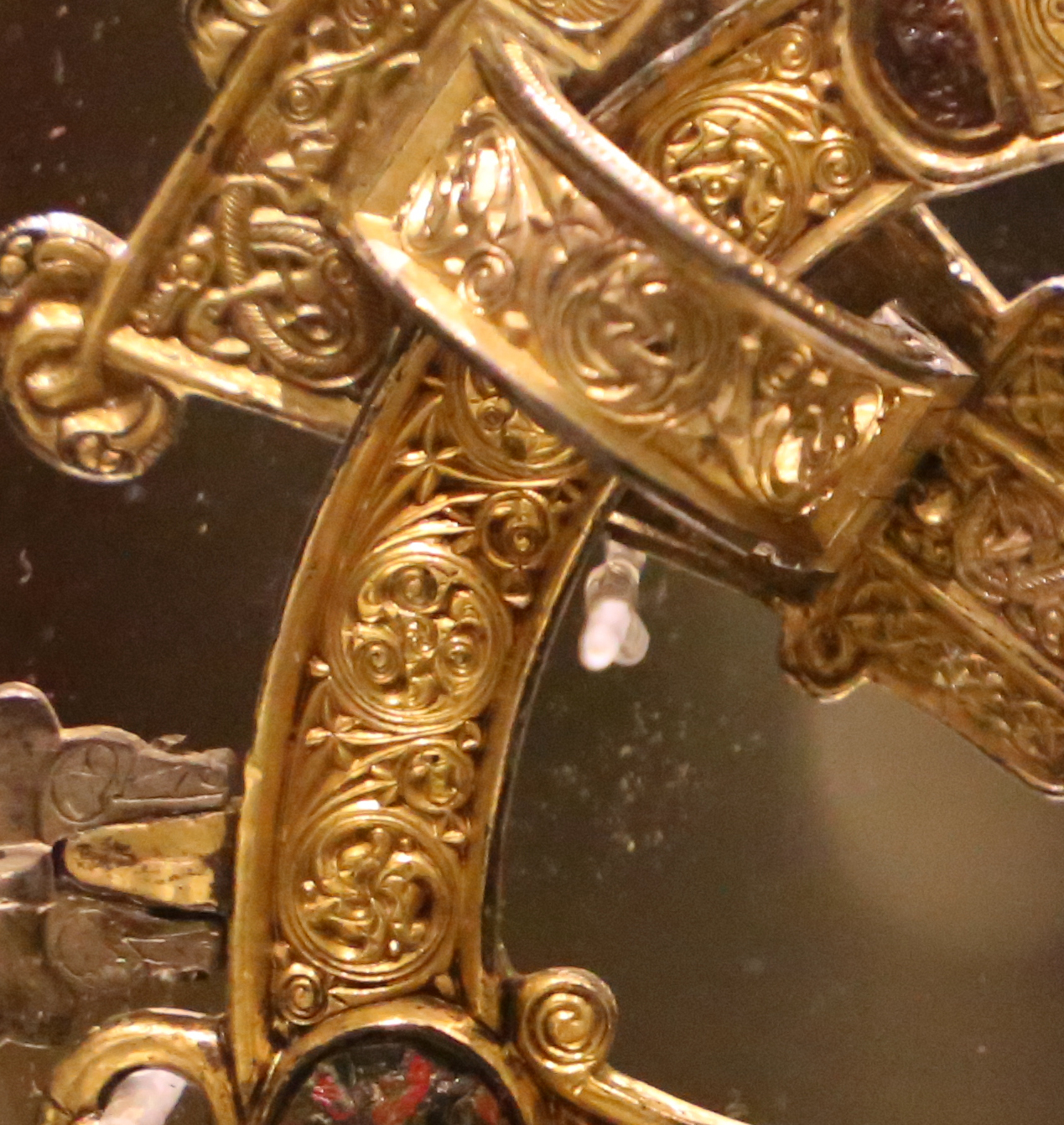
Panels on the reverse decorated with trumpet spirals and filigree

The head (or "hoop" or "ring") is made from cast and gilt silver and is decorated on both sides using techniques and patterns influenced by the Iron Age La Tène style. It consists of two large concentric circles, around 28 decorative panels, and a series of rounded studs lining both arms. The head is open on its top half, while the lower half is made of two fused terminals, and is thus solid and closed (i.e. pseudo-penannular), although its design does suggest an opening.

The front of the head is lined with twenty-eight sunken panels soldered onto gold sheets. They are held in place by the then-new technique of "jewellers' stitches" (also known as "bead settings" or "milli-graining"), that is intricate and complex filigree patterns formed by minute bands of silver wire. Eighteen panels retain their gilt filigree; the others are either corroded or have been broken off since the brooch was rediscovered in 1850. Other decorative elements include cast depictions of animals (mostly thin-bodied fish) and abstract motifs, separated by glass studs, enamel, and amber. The friezes on the head contain chip-carved roundels (circular discs). Other La Tène elements include the patterns around the centre of the head and terminals, which are silver and a dark red at the terminals but lined with gold at the head.

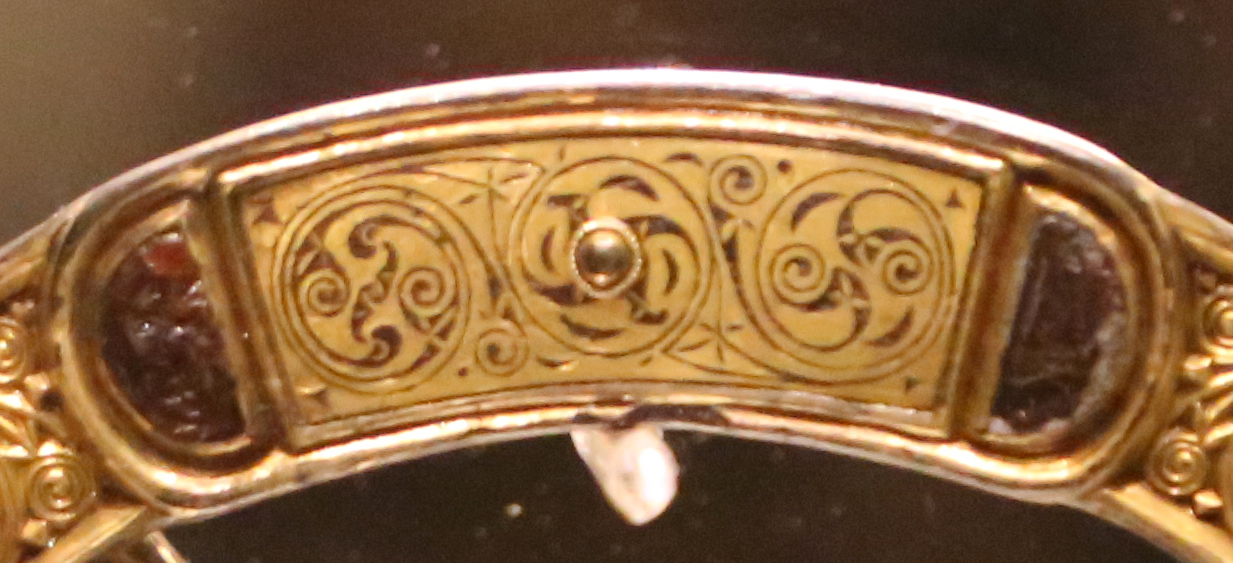
Cartouche at the top of the head (reverse view)

The reverse is equally decorated, which is unusual given that it would have been hidden against the wearer's garment. Its decorations include rows of chip-carved interlace animals and birds, terminating in trumpet spirals.

=== Terminals ===
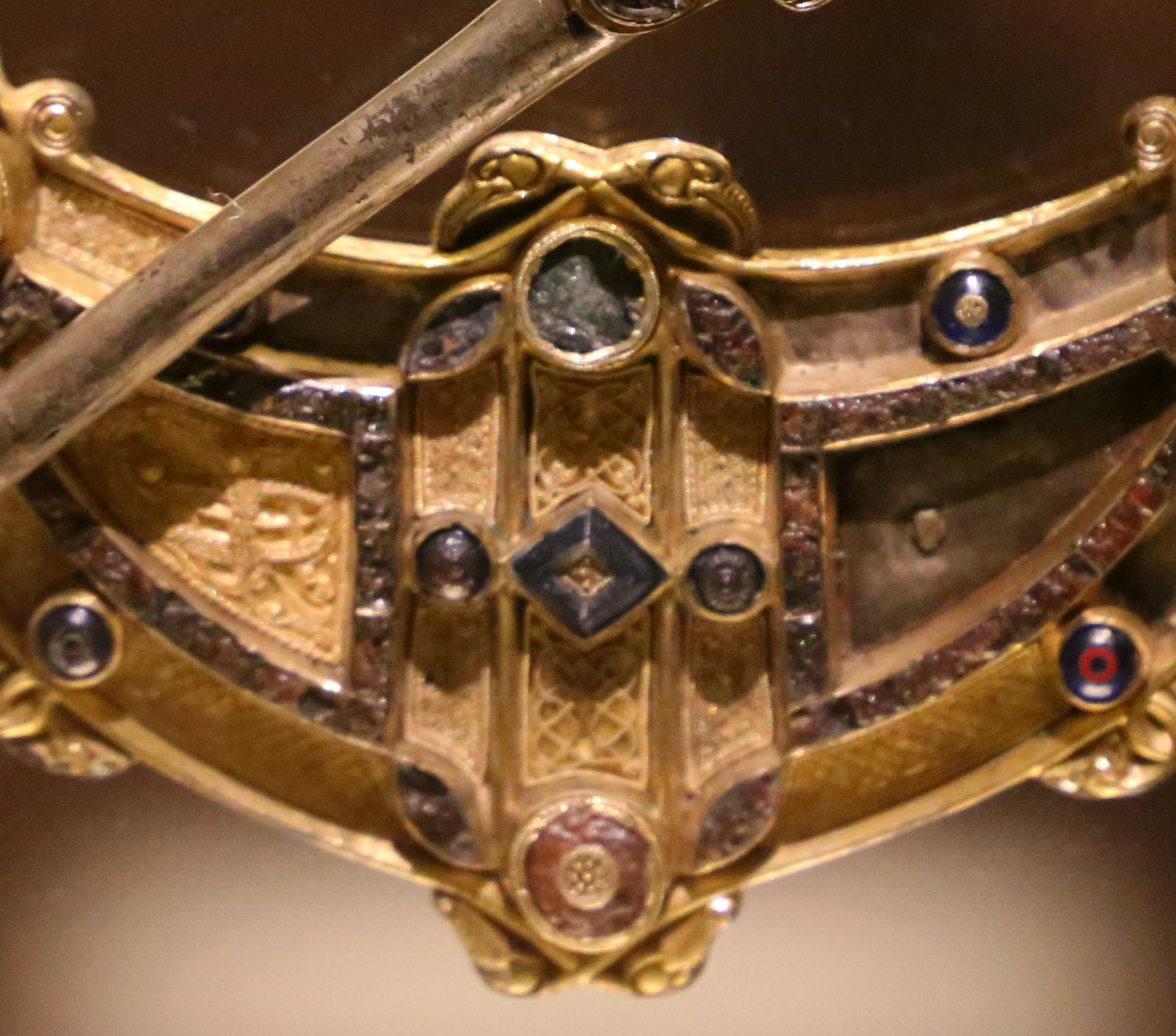
Glass studs on the terminals of the front side

The three large and thin panels on the front side of the terminals are intended to represent the gap in open brooches. They are richly ornamented with filigree and a row of three studs. The reverse is coloured in gold, black and red and contains further La Tène designs, including a frieze of four roundels. The hoop and terminals are joined by silver-grilled glass studs in red and blue that adopt contemporary Germanic garnet cloisonné techniques, and in part resemble those on the 8th-century Moylough Belt-Shrine and Ardagh Chalice (8th and 9th centuries). The combination of red and blue glass is unusual for the period.

The reverse contains two trapezoids in the La Tène style, set against a silver and niello background. On each side, the bridge between the head and terminals contains a single large dome-shaped stud. The two terminals and their bridge resemble the heads of two beasts biting at each other.

=== Pin and chain ===
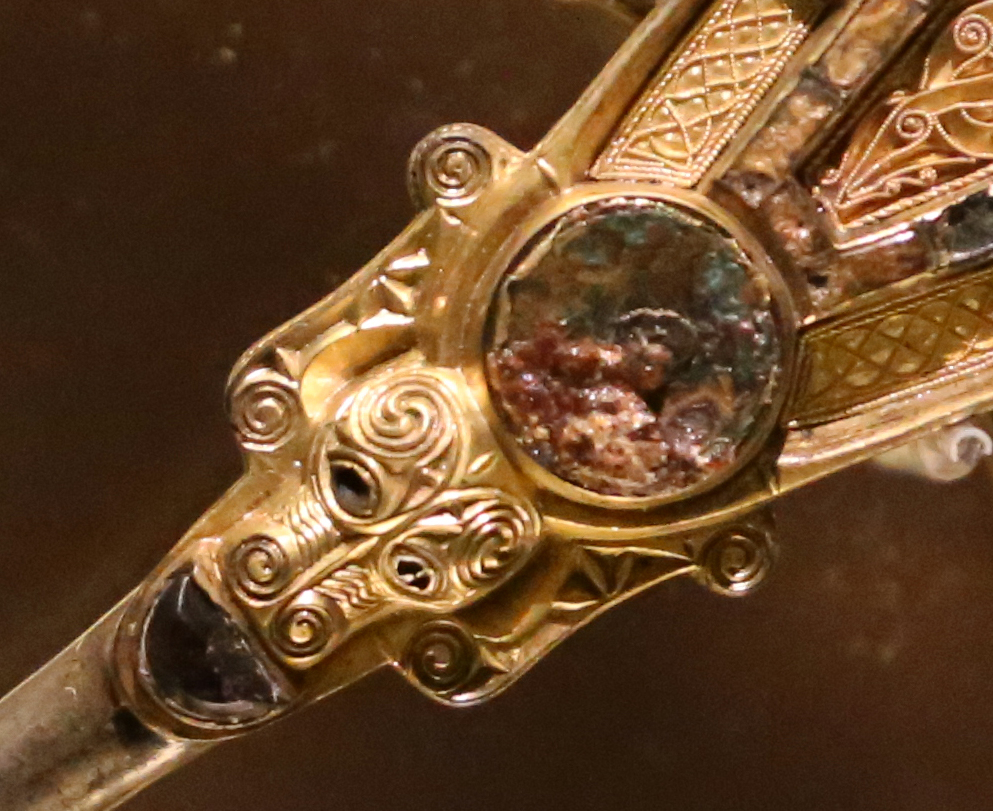
Glass-eyed serpent on the front of the pin-head

The pin is attached to the upper end of the head by a long oval and gilded panel shaped like a serpent with glass eyes. It is hinged to two ancillary panels with paired animal heads (which may be wolves or dragons) at the ends and two human faces formed from purple glass.

The plaited (interlaced) silver chain is attached to the hook by a swivel. Most likely, it was originally wrapped around pieces of the garment to hold the brooch more securely. Other theories suggest it was used as a safety chain to prevent it from being dropped, or that the brooch was once part of a pair linked together by the chain.

== Condition ==
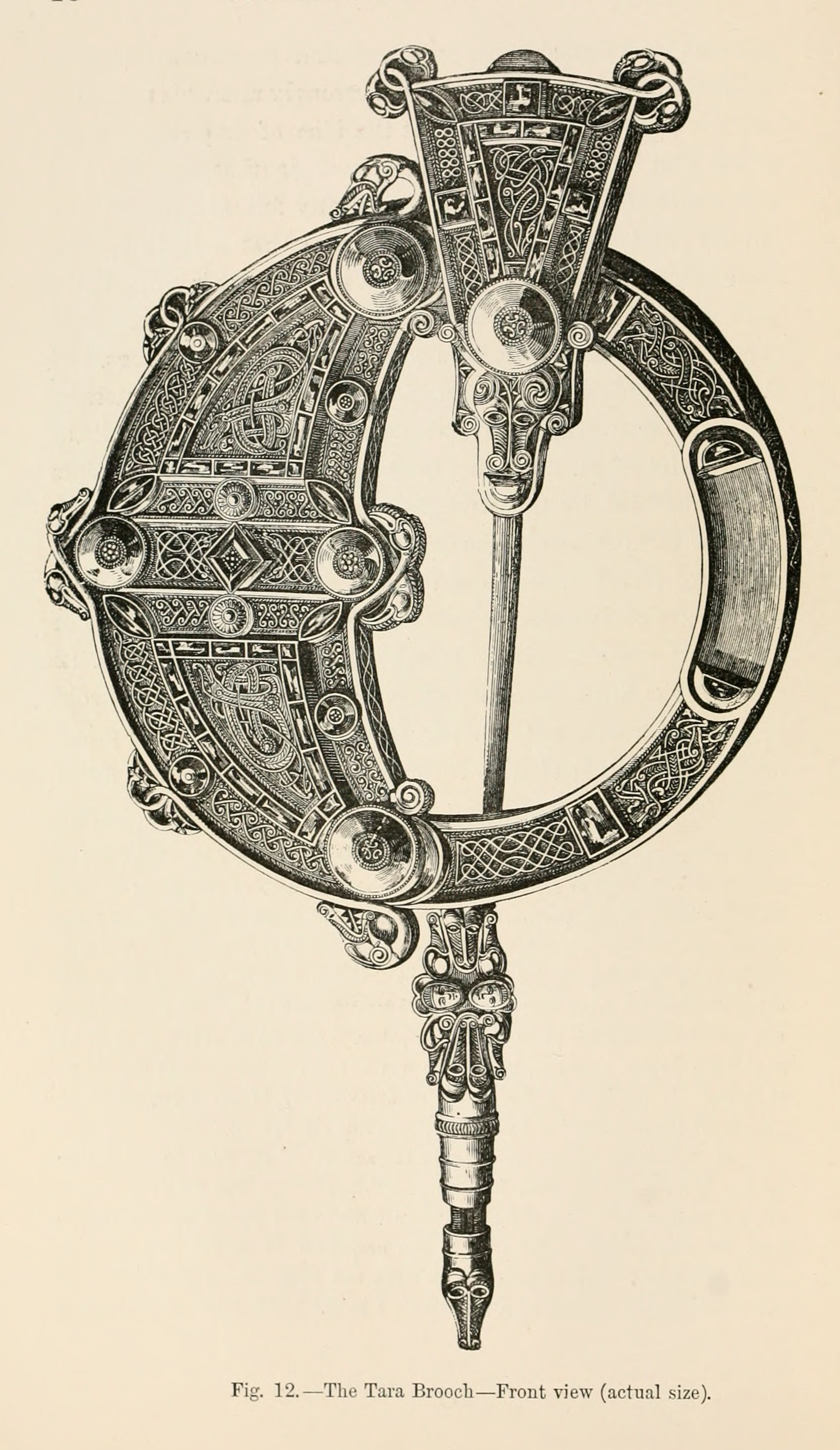
1881 illustration

When discovered, the brooch was almost fully intact but has since sustained substantial losses. Ten of the front inserts and three studs are now missing, while two more have lost their filigree. Comparison with mid-19th-century photographs shows that when found, the brooch was missing only a single panel.

The earliest surviving reproductions are two 1852 wood engravings, which show it, according to Whitfield, "in near perfect condition" with the majority of the now-missing filigree, studs, and inserted interlace designs intact. (Note: A December 10th 1850 introduction to Petrie's RIA lecture mentions a "number of minute and careful drawings of various scrolls and devices of this most remarkable piece of ancient art", but none survive.)

== Discovery ==
Although named after the Hill of Tara (seat and necropolis of the High Kings of Ireland), the brooch bears no connection to Tara. The brooch was found in c. 1850 on the beach at Bettystown, near Laytown, in County Meath, not far from Drogheda and about 25 kilometres from Tara. The finder, the son of a local peasant woman, is said to have found it in a container buried in the sand, though it is likely that it was found inland, by a river, and she said it was found at the beach to avoid a legal claim by the landowner.

The title was given by an early owner, the Dublin jeweller George Waterhouse, for marketing reasons, to make his reproductions more culturally resonant. At the time, Waterhouse's main source of income was selling replicas of recently found Celtic Revival jewellery, and according to Whitfield was "in the habit of attaching romantic and high-sounding names to brooches of which they sold replicas".

The circumstances of its discovery meant that no contemporary archaeological survey was conducted at the find-spot. However, late 20th-century excavations of the area by the beach found a large burial site in use from the prehistoric to the Early medieval period. This has led to speculation that the brooch was buried as part of a hoard, but no other objects have been found. Equally, the date and reasons for its burial are unknown; most likely it was placed in the earth to hide it from Viking or Norman invaders, or following a defeat at battle. A 12th-century codex, the Book of Leinster, contains a section titled "The siege of Howth" which mentions a precious brooch buried after a defeat, leading some art historians to speculate that a similar fate befell the Tara Brooch.

== 19th-century reception ==
Celtic Revival jewellery became fashionable in the 1840s. Utilising this trend, Waterhouse later placed the Tara Brooch as the centrepiece of his replica Celtic brooches in his Dublin shop, and exhibited it at the Great Exhibition of 1851 in London, the Great Industrial Exhibition of 1853 in Dublin, and Exposition Universelle of 1855 in Paris. His Tara brooch replicas were approximately one-third smaller than the original and far simpler in design. Waterhouse chose the brooch's name, deliberately but falsely linking it to the site associated with the High Kings of Ireland, "fully aware that this would feed the Irish middle-class fantasy of being descended from them". He produced several replicas, which were generally smaller and less detailed than the original.

The Dublin exhibition was visited by Queen Victoria, who had an interest in the Hill of Tara, and who liked these Celtic brooches and purchased several facsimiles of the brooch, although she did not know that it had been found in Bettystown. Prince Albert had already bought two similar pieces for her when the two of them visited Dublin in 1849.

== Sources ==
- Backhouse, Janet (1981). The Lindisfarne Gospels. Ithaca (NY): Cornell University Press. ISBN 978-0-7148-2461-1.
- Briggs, Stephen (2017). "The Roscrea Brooch Re-Provenanced?". Ulster Journal of Archaeology. 74: 74–86. JSTOR 26788433.
- Carew, Mairead (7 February 2017). "British Jewish leaders searched for the Ark of the Covenant at Tara". IrishCentral.
- De Paor, Liam (1977). "The Christian Triump: The Golden Age". Treasures of early Irish art, 1500 B.C. to 1500 A.D: From the collections of the National Museum of Ireland, Royal Irish Academy, Trinity College Dublin. NY: Metropolitan Museum of Art. ISBN 978-0-8709-9164-6.
- Edwards, Nancy (2006). The Archaeology of Early Medieval Ireland. London: Routledge. ISBN 978-0-4152-2000-2.
- Farley, Julia; Hunter, Fraser, eds. (2015). Celts - Art and Identity. London: British Museum. ISBN 978-0-7141-2836-8.
- Gere, Charlotte; Rudoe, Judy (2010). Jewellery in the Age of Queen Victoria: a Mirror to the World. British Museum Publications. ISBN 978-0-7141-2819-1.
- Harrison, Bernice (16 March 2019). "Design Moment: Tara Brooch, 8th century". The Irish Times.
- Moss, Rachel (2014). Medieval c. 400—c. 1600: Art and Architecture of Ireland. Yale University Press. ISBN 978-0-3001-7919-4.
- Ó Floinn, Raghnal; Wallace, Patrick, eds. (2002). Treasures of the National Museum of Ireland: Irish Antiquities. Dublin: National Museum of Ireland. ISBN 0-9503-4281-5.
- O'Toole, Fintan (3 September 2011), A history of Ireland in 100 objects: Tara Brooch, eighth century, The Irish Times
- Ryan, Michael (2011). "Metalwork in Ireland from the Late Seventh to the Ninth Century: A Review". In Hourihane, Colum (ed.). Insular and Anglo-Saxon Art and Thought in the Early Medieval Period. Princeton (NJ): Princeton University. ISBN 978-0-9837-5370-4.
- Somerville, Orna (1993). "Kite-Shaped Brooches". Journal of the Royal Society of Antiquaries of Ireland. 123 (1993): 59–101. JSTOR 25509045.
- Stevenson, Robert (1984). "Further notes on the Hunterston and 'Tara' brooches, Monymusk reliquary, and Blackness bracelet". Proceedings of the Society of Antiquaries of Scotland. 113: 469–477. doi:10.9750/PSAS.113.469.477. S2CID 56322447.
- Stevick, Robert (1998). "The Form of the Tara Brooch". The Journal of the Royal Society of Antiquaries of Ireland. 128: 5–16. JSTOR 25549839.
- Stokes, Margaret (1879). "Inquiry as to the Probable Date of the Tara Brooch an Chalice Found near Ardagh". Proceedings of the Royal Irish Academy. Polite Literature and Antiquities. 2: 451–455. JSTOR 20651541.
- Whitfield, Niamh (July 2009). ""More Like the Work of Fairies Than of Human Beings": The Filigree on the "Tara" Brooch, a Masterpiece of Late Celtic Metalwork". ArchéoSciences. 33 (2).
- Whitfield, Niamh. "Motifs and techniques in Early Medieval Celtic filigree". In: Moss, Rachel (ed). Making and Meaning in Insular Art. Dublin: Four Courts Press, 2007. ISBN 978-1-8518-2986-6
- Whitfield, Niamh (2004). "More Thoughts on the Wearing of Brooches in Early Medieval Ireland". In Hourihane, Colum (ed.). Irish Art Historical Studies in honour of Peter Harbison. Dublin: Four Courts Press. ISBN 978-1-8518-2847-0.
- Whitfield, Niamh (2001). "The "Tara" brooch: an Irish emblem of status in its European context". In Hourihane, Colm (ed.). From Ireland Coming: Irish art from the early Christian to the late Gothic period and its European context. Princeton (NJ): Princeton University Press. ISBN 978-0-6910-8825-9.
- Whitfield, Niamh (1993). "The Filigree of the Hunterston and 'Tara' Brooches". The Age of Migrating Ideas. Early Medieval Art in Northern Britain and Ireland. Stroud (Gloucestershire): Sutton. ISBN 978-0-7509-0357-8.
- Whitfield, Niamh (1976). "The Original Appearance of the Tara Brooch". The Journal of the Royal Society of Antiquaries of Ireland. 106: 5–30. JSTOR 25508687.
- Whitfield, Niamh (1974). "The Finding of the Tara Brooch". The Journal of the Royal Society of Antiquaries of Ireland. 104: 120–142. JSTOR 25508645.
- Youngs, Susan, ed. (1989). "The Work of Angels", Masterpieces of Celtic Metalwork, 6th–9th centuries AD. London: British Museum Press. ISBN 0-7141-0554-6.
- "Tara Brooch". National Museum of Ireland.
