= Coggalbeg hoard =

Early Bronze Age hoard of Irish gold jewellery

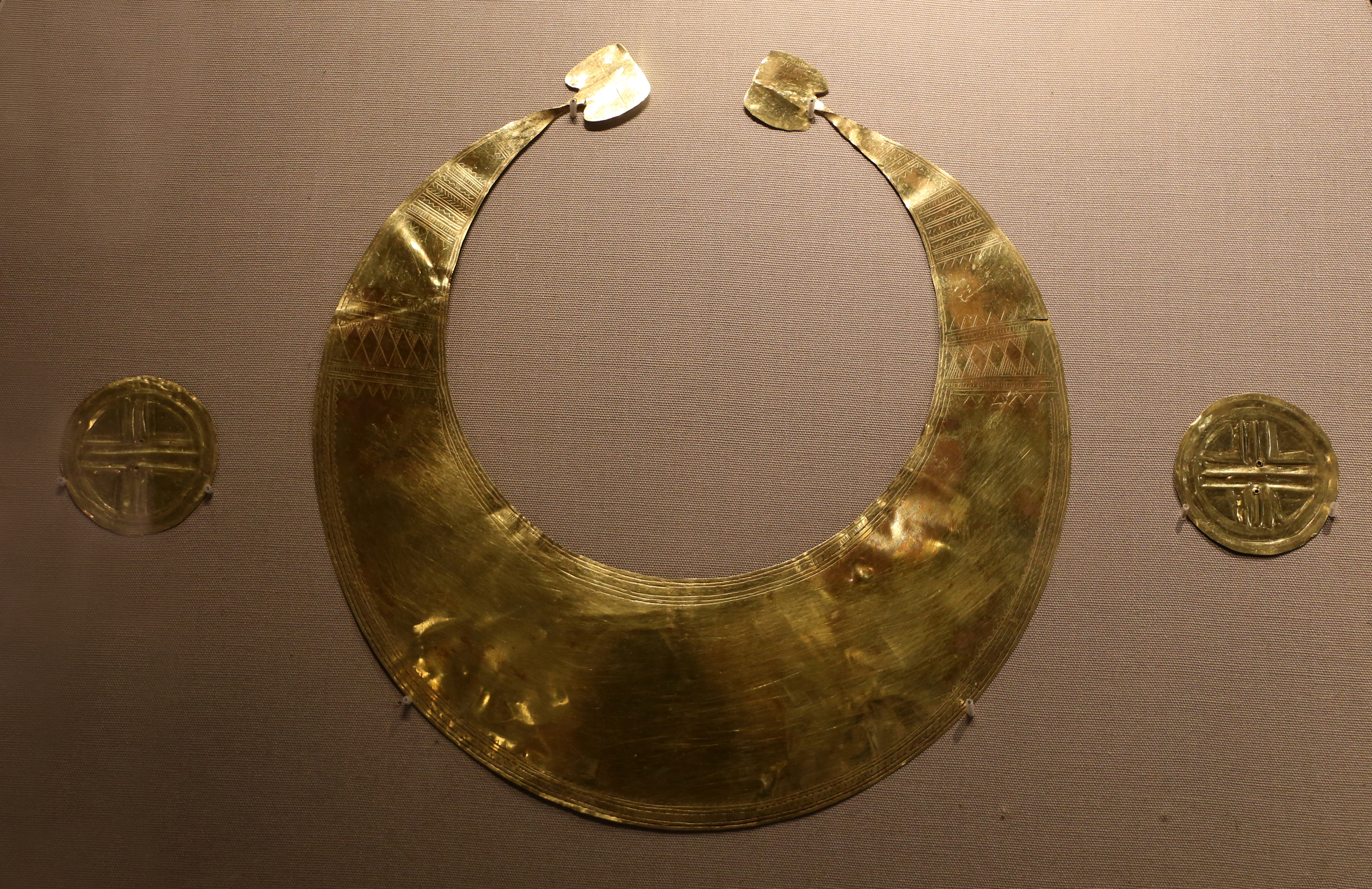
- Material: Gold
- Created: 2300–2000 BC
- Discovered: 1945; Coggalbeg, County Roscommon, Ireland
- Present location: National Museum of Ireland, Kildare Street, Dublin

The Coggalbeg hoard is an Early Bronze Age hoard of three pieces of Irish gold jewellery dating to 2300–2000 BC. It is now in the National Museum of Ireland – Archaeology in Dublin, where it is normally on display.

It was found in a bog at Coggalbeg, County Roscommon in 1945, and consists of a gold lunula (a crescent shaped "little moon") and two small gold discs, of a type known from other examples, decorated with a cross motif within two circles. The pieces are flat and thin, and collectively weigh under 78 grams (2.8 oz), indicating that they were probably intended as part of a necklace.

In 2017 the three objects were featured on an Irish postal stamp, one of a series showing A History of Ireland in 100 Objects.

== Discovery ==
The hoard was discovered in 1945 by Hubert Lannon while cutting turf on his bog in Roscommon. From 1947, it was kept in a safe at Sheehan's Chemists in Strokestown, during which time it was only seen by members of the Sheehan family. Following a break-in at the pharmacy, in which the safe was stolen, the objects were found by the Garda Síochána (Irish police) wrapped in paper in a rubbish skip in April 2009. Due to its lightness in weight, police believe that the thieves were primarily interested in cash and drugs and were not aware of the objects' presence in the discarded loot.

== Research ==
Today it is held by the National Museum of Ireland – Archaeology, where it is on permanent display. According to Mary Cahill of the museum, the objects are significant as the only extant "association between the discs and the lunula, because the discs would be considered among the earliest gold ornaments and the lunula as coming a little bit later". The lunula is of the "Classical" type, considered the earliest and finest of three types of lunula. Of the estimated 100 lunula known in Western Europe, some 80 originate in Ireland.

== Sources ==
- Ó Floinn, Raghnal; Wallace, Patrick. Treasures of the National Museum of Ireland: Irish Antiquities. Dublin: National Museum of Ireland, 2002. ISBN 978-0-7171-2829-7
