= Ballinderry Sword =

Irish Viking-style sword

The Ballinderry Sword is an iron Viking-style weapon found in a bog on the site of a crannog (lake dwelling) in Ballinderry, in Rosemount, County Westmeath, Ireland in 1928. It is No. 36 in A History of Ireland in 100 Objects. It was found along with other Viking objects: a longbow, two spearheads, an axe head and a gaming board. The settlement dates from between the late 9th and early 11th centuries, and the collection of artifacts uncovered appears to fit the profile of a wealthy Irish farmer or of a local ruler.

The sword's pommel is coated in a sheet of silver and consists of five distinct sections that slowly rise to a rounded tip in the middle. Below these sections is a band of silver decorated with a recessed pattern of swirls that loop around the pommel. The hilt of the sword is also coated in silver and bears the same swirl pattern as the band on the pommel. There is little doubt but that this was a very high-status object.

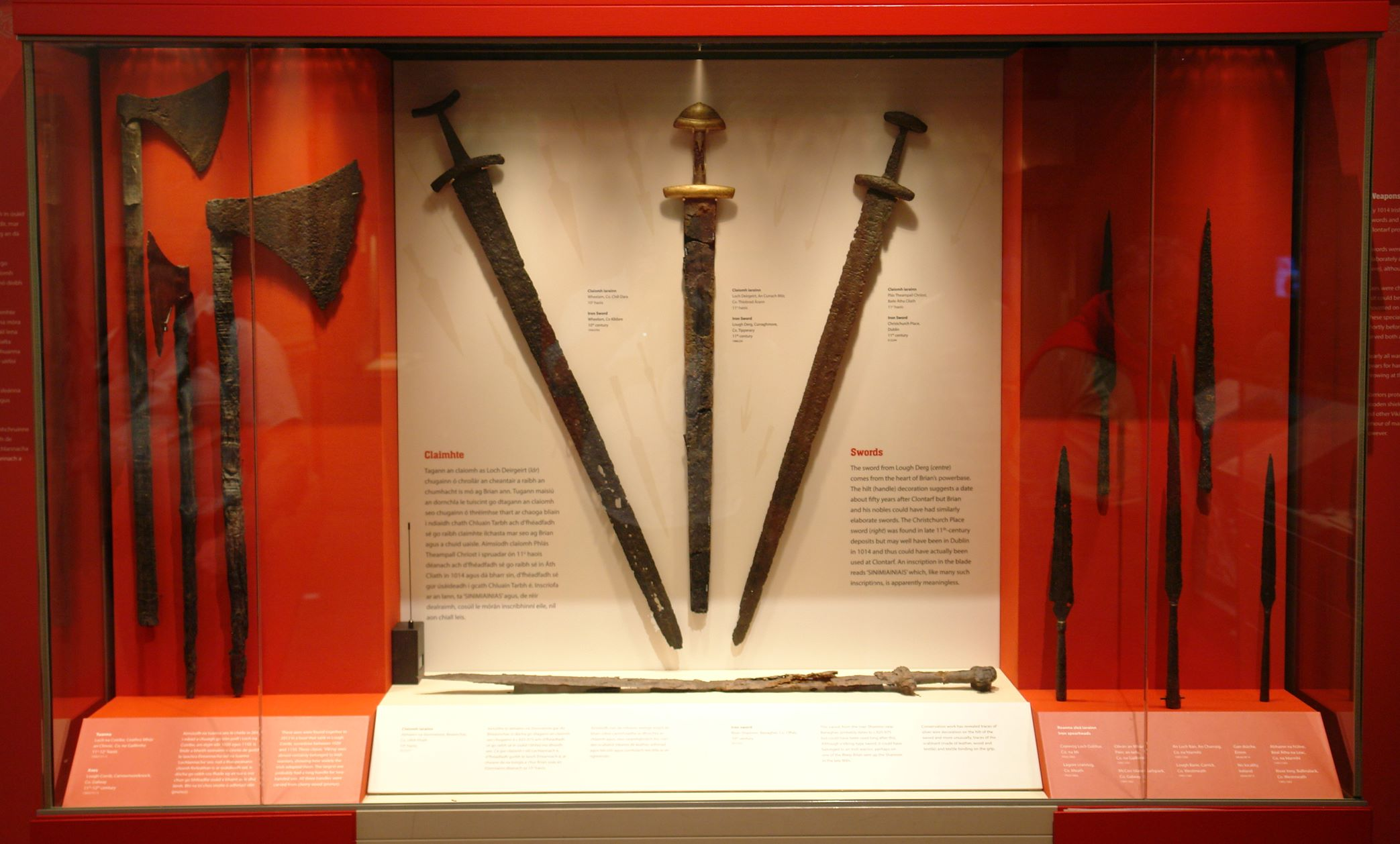
Other 11th-century Irish swords, National Museum of Ireland

The blade on the sword is very wide, which is typical of Viking swords. The blade tapers to a point and is 79 centimeters long. The blade has an inscription of ULFBERHT, a Rhineland manufacturer. About 200 of these blades have been discovered as far away as Russia, suggesting that this was the early equivalent of an "international brand". While the blade was imported, the hilt and pommel were made by Vikings. The upper side bears the name HILTIPREHT, which seems to connect it to a Norwegian craftsman of that name.

The sword, which is on display at the National Museum of Ireland, Dublin is in much better condition compared to many other similar international finds.
