= Wroxeter Stone =

Insular Celtic inscribed stone found in England

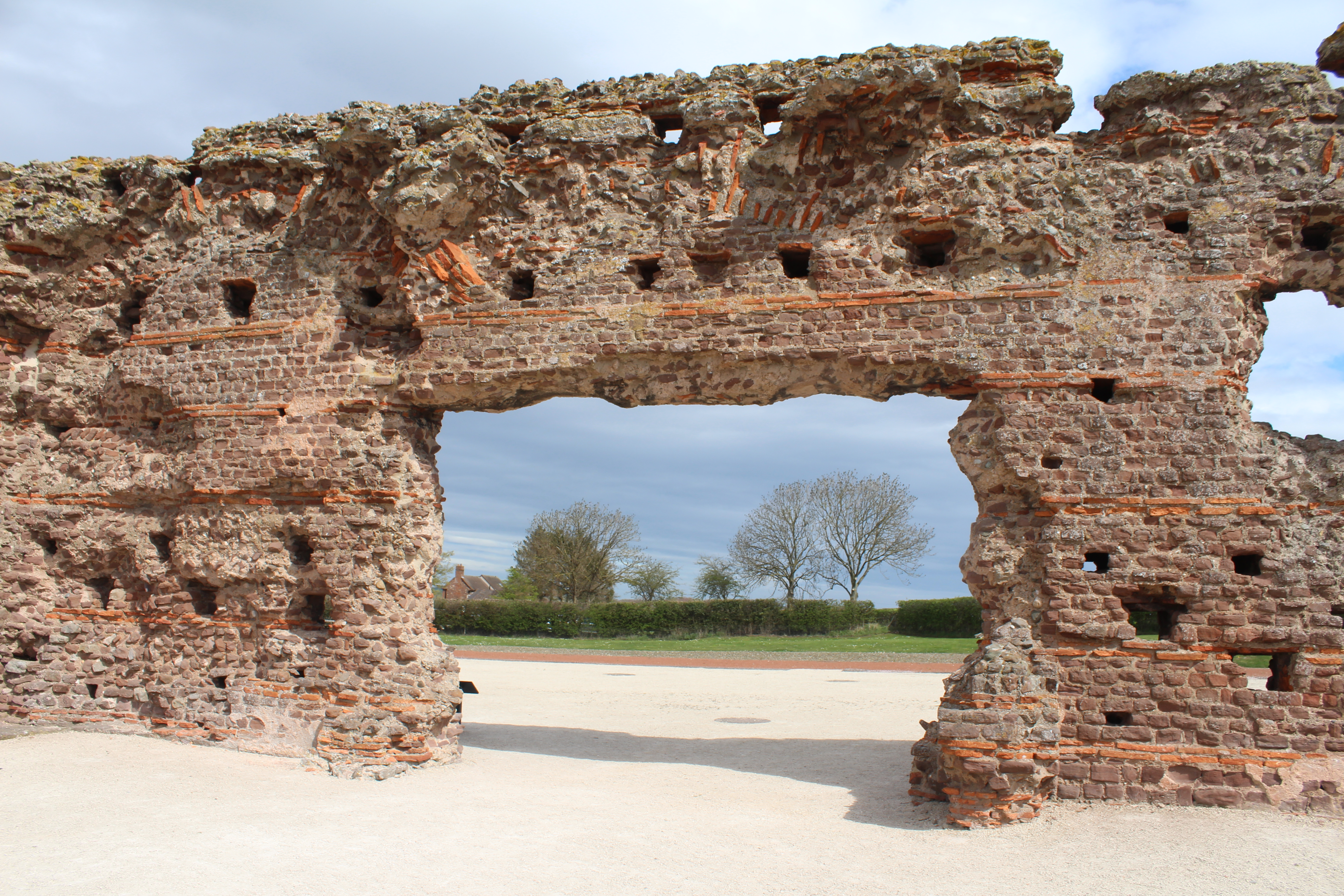
Stonework from the remains of the Roman city at Wroxeter

The Wroxeter Stone is the name given to a c. 460–75 AD inscribed stone unearthed in 1967 at Wroxeter, England (earlier the Roman city of Viroconium Cornoviorum). The stone is in the care of English Heritage, and was included in A History of Ireland in 100 Objects as the Cunorix Stone.

== Inscription ==
Its inscription is in an Insular Celtic language, identified by the Inscribed Stones Project at UCL as "partly-Latinized Primitive Irish", and comes from a period several decades after the collapse of Roman authority in Roman Britain, when Irish raiders had begun to make permanent settlements in South Wales and south-western Britain. The text reads: CVNORIX | MACVSM/A | QVICO[L]I[N]E, traditionally normalised as Cunorix macus Maqui Coline and translated as Cunorīx son of Maqqos Colinī, where Cunorīx and Maqqos Colinī are personal names. Cunorīx, literally meaning 'hound-king', is a well attested Celtic name, and may relate to the etymology of the name of Cynric of Wessex, a 6th-century king. Maqui Coline was read by Kenneth H. Jackson as a rendering of Primitive Irish *Maqqī-Colinī (genitive of *Maqqos-Colinī); this name literally means 'son of holly', but is an example of a type of name fashionable in early Irish that, despite looking like patronyms, were in fact given names. It is one of a number of such names that include words for trees and is attested in later Old Irish in the form Macc-Cuilinn.
