= Moylough Belt-Shrine =

Irish reliquary shaped in the form of a belt

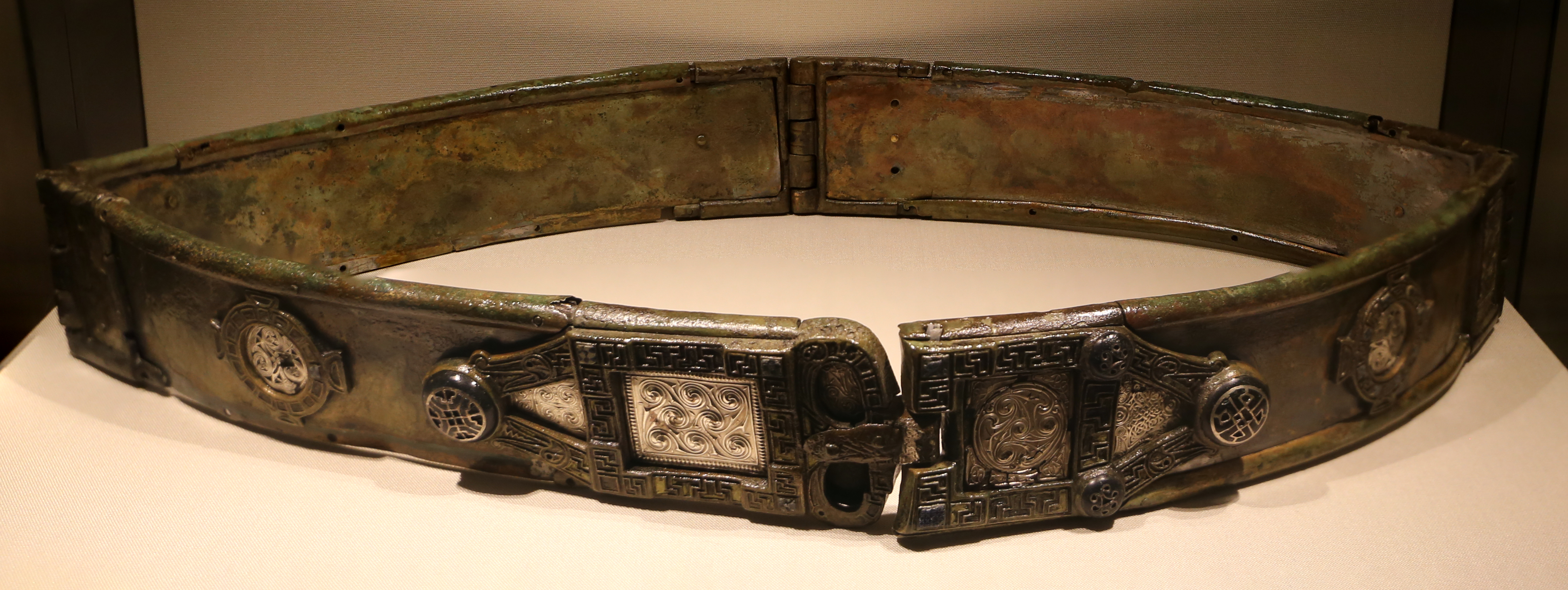
- The Moylough Belt-Shrine
- Material: Copper-alloy, silver, mica, enamel, glass, millefiori, leather
- Size: Length (extended): 90.1cm, width (average): 5.2cm
- Period/culture: c. 700 AD
- Place: Moylough townland, County Sligo, Ireland
- Present location: National Museum of Ireland, Kildare Street, Dublin
- Identification: NMI 1945:81

The Moylough Belt-Shrine is a highly decorated 8th-century Irish reliquary shaped in the form of a belt. It consists of four hinged bronze segments, each forming cavities that hold strips of plain leather assumed to have once been a girdle belonging to a saint and thus the intended relic. It remains the only known relic container created as a belt-shrine, although such objects are mentioned in some lives of Irish saints, where they are attributed with "remarkable cures", and there are surviving reliquary buckles in continental Europe. The belt may have been influenced by 7th-century Frankish and Burgundian types.

The shrine was found by John Towey in April or May 1945 in a peat bog near Moylough, a townland on the outskirts of Tubbercurry, County Sligo. It is dated to the 8th century based on the similarity of its decorations, particularly the glass studs, to those on the Ardagh Chalice (8th or 9th century).

The art historian Raghnall Ó Floinn has described the belt as "one of the major treasures of Early Christian Irish art", and it is noted for both the evident craftsmanship, and quality of its design elements, including the cast-bronze medallions, enamel and stamped silver inlays, the animal and bird heads, and spiral patterns. It is held at the archaeology building of the National Museum of Ireland (NMI) in Dublin, where it is on permanent display in its Treasury room.

== Description ==
The belt-shrine is built from four segments joined together by hinges. Each segment contains two strips of sheet bronze held together with bindings and rivets, and each encase a strip of leather. The outward faces are decorated with enamel and glass cross-shaped medallions, two of which are in the shape of ringed crosses, with the other intended as the arms of the cross, given that they are circular settings with D-shaped protruding on either side. The glass is mainly blue and white, while the enamel is coloured in red and, for one of the first times in Irish art, yellow.

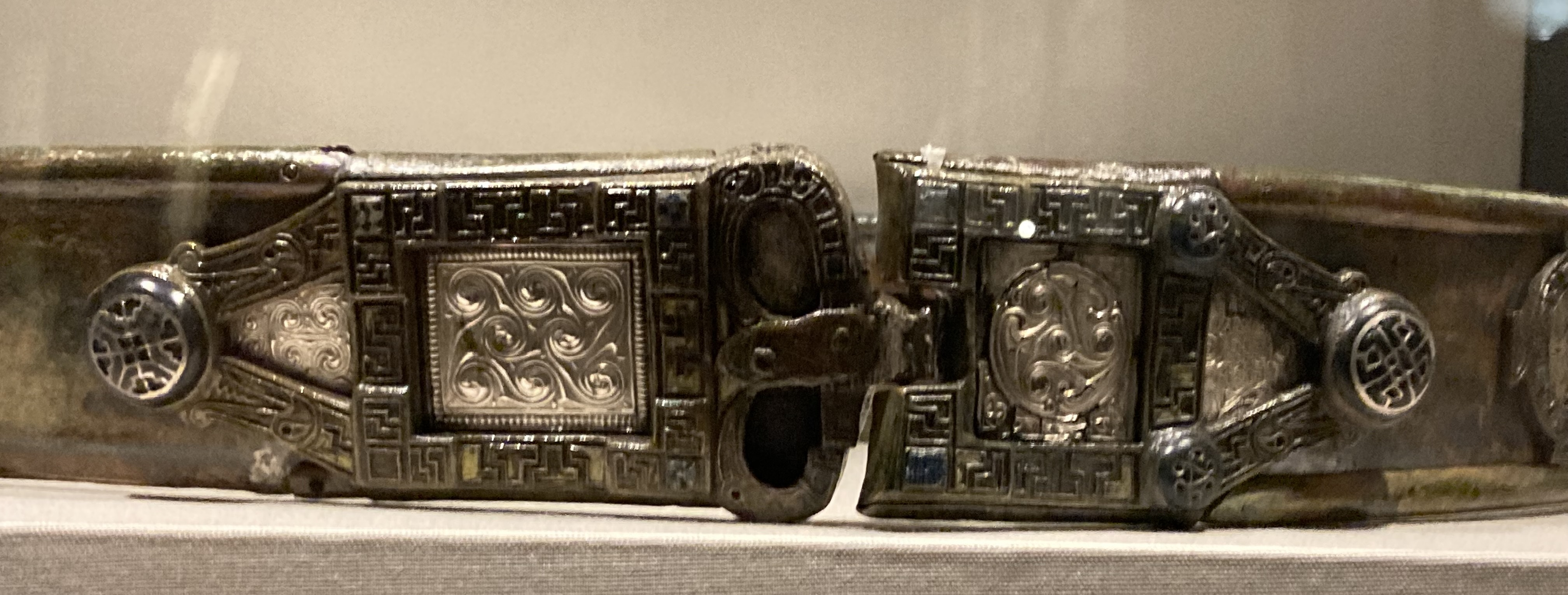
Detail of the buckle joining the two front segments, with silver inlay panels and glass studs on either side.

The belt is defined by the false buckle joining the two front segments. Each of these segments contains a large red and blue glass stud, and settings for silver die-stamped rectangular panels; a rare form of metalwork decoration for the period. Five of the panels survive, including two near the hinges, and two forming the false buckle and counter-plate. The glass medallions are unusually large, perhaps their size served to hide the joint-plate and rivets linking the visible metal sheets.

The imitation buckle and buckle-plate (or "counter-plate") join the two front segments and are the shrine's centre piece. They are elaborately decorated with foils, enamel, coloured glass and silver inlays. A pair of long-beaked bird's heads form the tongue of the buckle, while its ends and plate contain curly-snouted animal heads grasping at the glass studs and inlays.

== Dating ==
Given the evident wear and tear on the metal, Ó Floinn believes the shrine was "of considerable age" (that is, it had been in use for a long period) before being deposited in the bog. Based on its material and construction techniques, art historians generally date it to the 7th or 8th centuries, with a majority favouring, on stylistic grounds, the early 8th century. The stylistic aspects include its C-shaped bindings and silver inlaid glass studs are similar in style and construction method to the Ardagh Chalice, while the spirals are similar to those of folio 3v in the Book of Durrow, as well as those on a number of early medieval Irish High crosses.

The historian Michael Duignan noted that both the contrast between the shrine's plain and ornamented surfaces and the particular type of spiral designs seem influenced by 7th-century Irish hanging bowls, and thus placed the object –at earliest– in the latter part of that century.

The art historian Liam De Paor placed the object as "about 700 AD". He described it as an early but "mature" example of "animal ornament, kerbschnitt bronze reliefs, and lightly engraved motifs...against a silver background...the full development of these techniques may be seen [on the belt-shrine]...on which buckle and counter plate especially have been treated as fields for ornament".

== Function ==
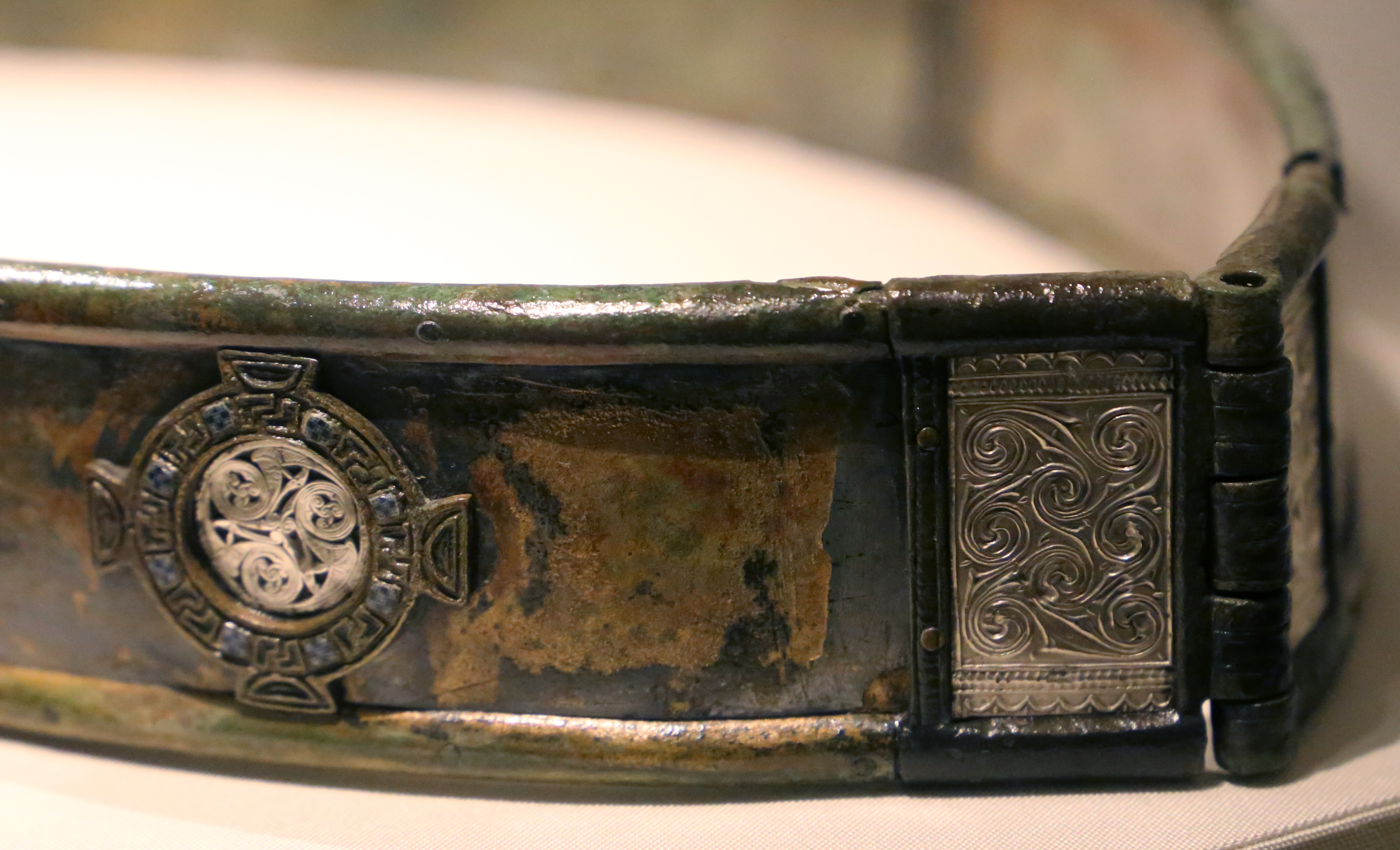
Decorations on the belt's clasp

The cult of relics was well established in Ireland by the early medieval period, and art historians agree that the shrine was purposely built to hold the leather girdle, or belt, that is still held within the bronze sheets, that must therefore have belonged to a saint. There are a number of reasons why the object could not have functioned as a day-to-day, working belt. It is made of hinged metal sheets so fixed at a width that would fit only a 90 cm waist, and could not be stretched or constrained to suit a different body size. However, given that the clasp could be opened and that there are hinges between the segments, it seems likely it may have been worn at times, most likely to cure illness, given that the belts of saints were sometimes associated with "remarkable cures". Karen Overbey mentions how, at the time: "when saints' belt...circled the bodies of supplicants, those bodies occupied the space of the saint's body". In the same way, other items of saint's clothes were revered as relics, including the chasuble of St Enda of Aran, and the 15th-century Shrine of St. Brigit's Shoe.

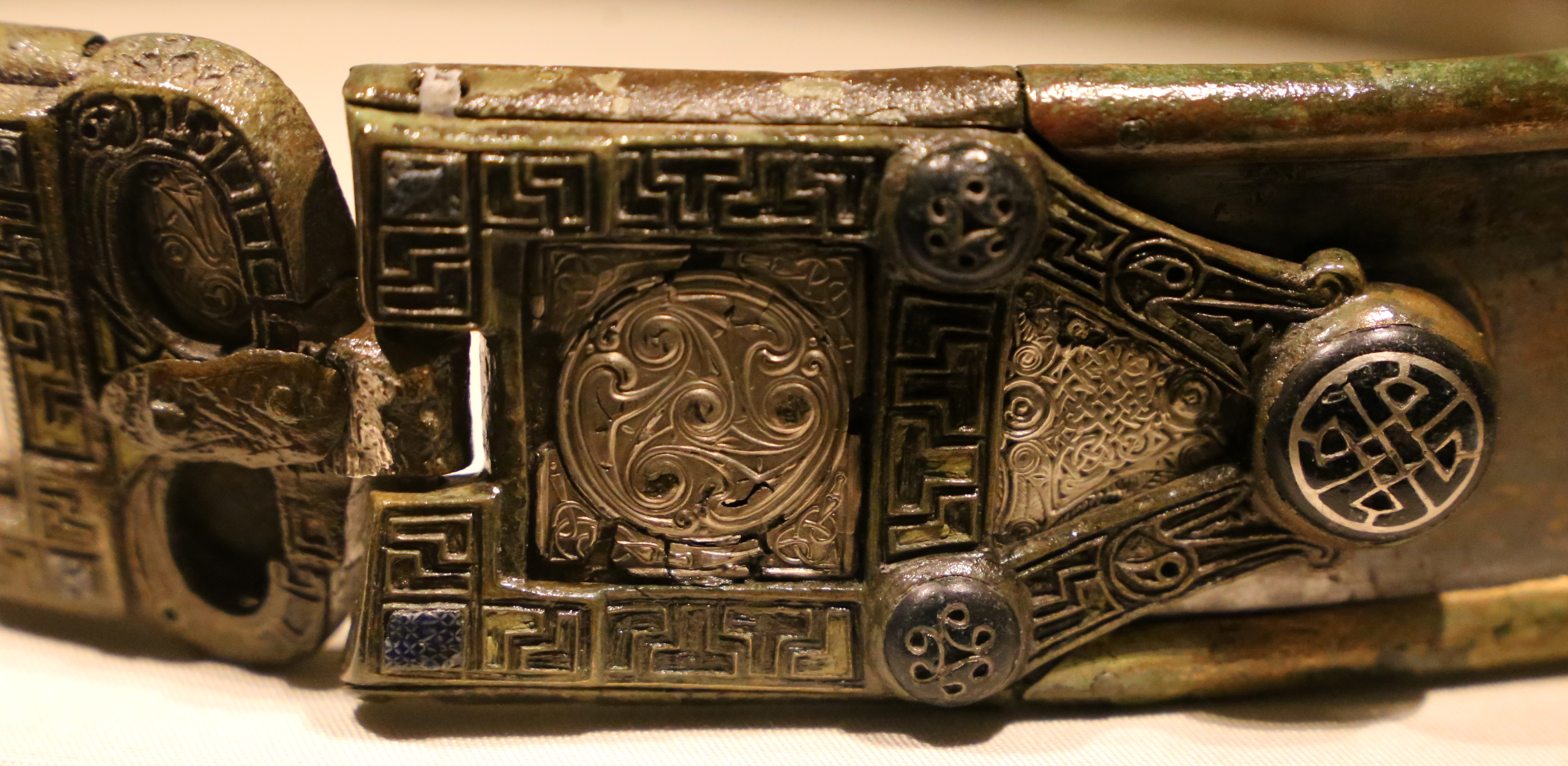
Detail of the clasp

Writing about its practical use, Michael O'Kelly wrote that some of the wear and tear, including a broken bow and bending of one of the segments, happened before it was buried, and thus it "cannot...have been a mere votive offering to or an adornment on some wonder-working image or statue, for this kind of use could have occasioned no wear and no breaks. The wear must be the result of continuous use of the shrine but not as an ordinary belt, nor even as one to be worn on special or ceremonial occasions".

However, there is no evidence to indicate which saint or church it was associated with, nor is it known when or why it was deposited in the bog. No other Irish belt-shrine has survived, although a number are mentioned in the records, including one associated with the female saint Samthann (d. 739), while records mention the girdles of St. Mobhí (d. 544) and Colman mac Duagh (d. 632). St. Mobhí's belt was said to have "never closed around lies", meaning that it was used during the swearing of oaths.

The metal belt format was popular with the Franks c. 700, and a number of Frankish monks are known to have travelled to Ireland in this period, while the Irish Missionary St. Columbanus was in contact with the Franks and Burgundians in the 7th century. The historian Michael Ryan states that the use of mica (a lustrous mineral often found in glittering granite) on the buckle counter-plate gave transparency, indicating that it may have served as a window through which the viewer could see the saint's belt. Further, he believes that the belt shrine may have been "placed around the bodies of people seeking the intercession of the saint".

== Discovery ==
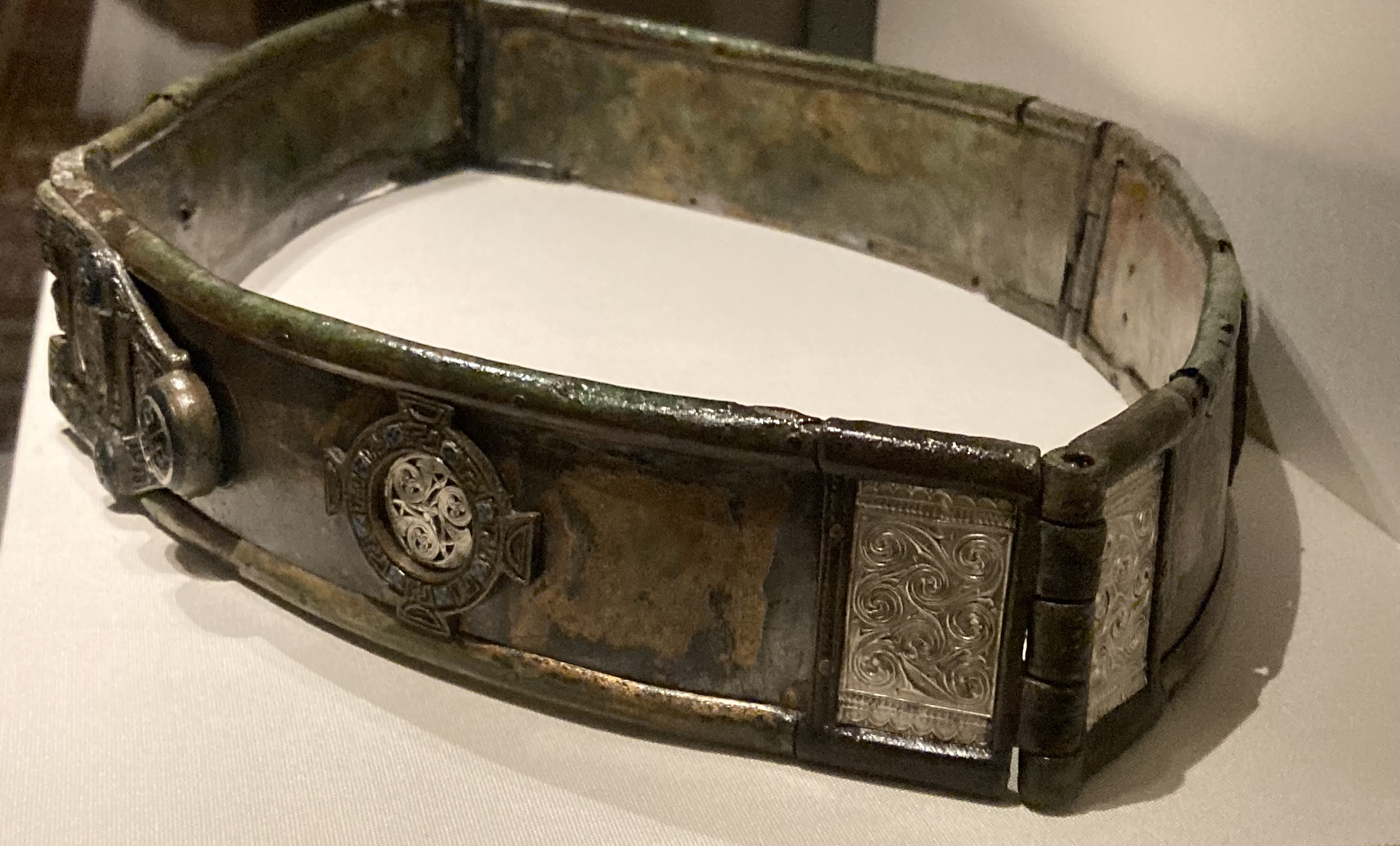
View of the belt-shrine

Moylough native John Towey, then 21 years old, found the shrine in Moylough in April or May 1945 while digging turf on his father's land. He described how his spade hit something hard at a depth of about three and half feet, which he assumed to be a stone. After clearing the surrounding peat with a trowel, he found the belt in an upright position and slightly open, in what appeared to be a diamond shape. He was digging in virgin turf and did not notice any covering or container. Towey said that the hinged sections were still movable, indicating that they have not suffered much corrosion. Not realising the age and value of the object, he kept it at his home for about a month, until his postman, John Nicholson guessed at its importance and advised him to contact the National Museum of Ireland (NMI).

Towey wrote to the NMI asking for assistance, declaring that: "I have found in the bog on the fourth split of turf what appears to be a belt. Its round in shape and has four separate pieces with Celtic crosses and it's made of iron. I would be much obliged if you could tell me what it is." The Museum quickly established the belt's approximate dating and acquired it a few weeks later. Joseph Raftery, the NMI's then Keeper of Antiquities (and later director), described it as an "exceedingly fine specimen of Early Christian metal, glass and enamel work of the 8th century A.D.", and as "easily one of the finest things that have been acquired by this division in the last 50 years."

Because turf cutting had continued in between, the find spot had been destroyed, it is unknown if the object had been accidentally lost or purposely buried for safe keeping, although the former is unlikely given its size. Towey viewed the shrine at the NMI a number of years later, and said that it had looked better when he first found it in 1945. In 1995 (shortly before Towey's death), the find spot was marked by a plaque erected commemorating the 50th anniversary of the discovery.

== Conservation ==
The Moylough Belt-Shrine was discovered during a period when the NMI was under financial stress, and its collection had just been returned from Athlone, where it had been stored during the Second World War. As the conservation of the belt was beyond the NMI's means, they contacted the British Museum in July 1945 to aid the project. Although the BM was under great financial and resource constraints in the aftermath of German bombing campaigns, they agreed to undertake extensive conservation work. The shrine was exhibited that year at a meeting of the Society of Antiquaries of London, and was returned to the NMI in February 1947.

Although the shrine is overall in good condition, some areas have suffered damage and losses, while others have been poorly repaired. Parts of the bronze work have been corroded by acids in the bog. The buckle seems to have been "crudely repaired in antiquity", while three of the silver panels do not quite match their fittings and maybe later additions. Some of the binding strips and rivets are missing, while parts of the buckle's glass studs have sustained damage. The tinned surface is worn and has faded, and the contrast between the bronze panels and silver side plates which, according to Ó Floinn "would have been striking".

The shrine is today considered to be one of the finest examples of Insular metalwork, and is on permanent display in the National Museum of Ireland's Treasury room. It has been shown internationally on a number of occasions, including in 1989 as part of the "Work of Angels" exhibition at the British Museum.
