= Ballinderry Brooch =

Irish penannular brooch

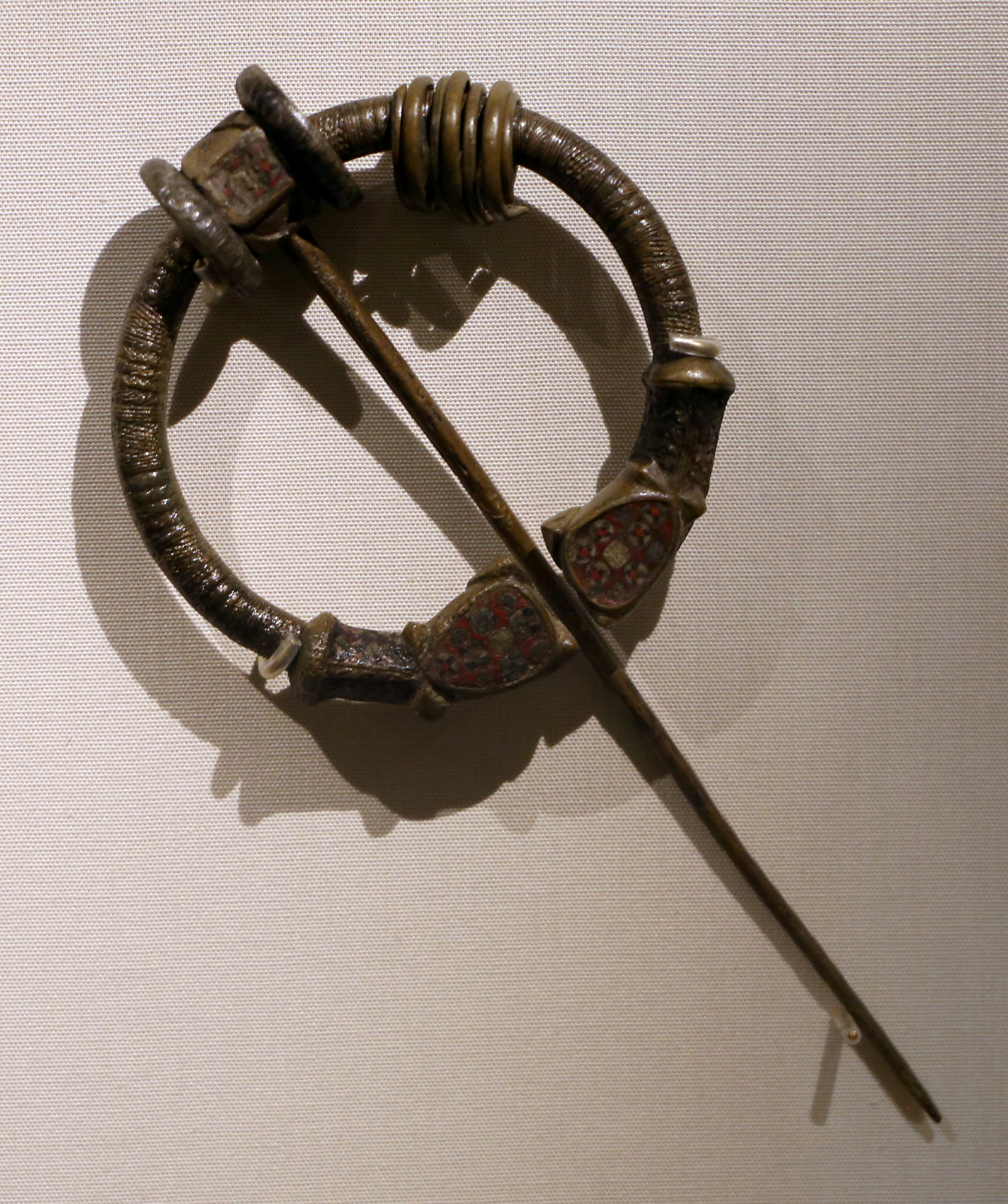
- Material: Copper-alloy, tin, enamel, millefiori
- Size: head (diameter): 8.6cm, pin (length) 18.3cm
- Period/culture: late 6th or early 7th century
- Place: Ballinderry lake, County Offaly
- Present location: National Museum of Ireland, Kildare Street, Dublin
- Identification: NMI E6:422

The Ballinderry Brooch is an Irish penannular brooch dated to the late 6th or early 7th centuries. It was found in the 1930s, along with a number of similar objects, underneath a timber floor of the late Bronze Age Ballinderry Crannóg No.2, on Ballinderry lake, County Offaly. Made from copper-alloy, tin and enamel, and decorated with millefiori patterns, it is relatively small, with a maximum ring diameter of 8.6 cm, while its pin is 18.3 cm long.

The brooch is on permanent display in the National Museum of Ireland Treasury room. It is considered one of the most important and elaborately formed and decorated of the surviving penannular brooches. Although locally produced, it may have connections to Anglo-Saxon metalworkers as it closely resembles designs from a fragment of a hanging-bowl frame dated as pre-625 (probably 600 AD), from the Sutton Hoo hoard.

== Discovery ==
It is thought to pre-date early medieval refurbishments of the Crannóg (a type of Bronze Age river dwelling), and it is likely that at some point it was "pushed down between the timbers to hide it" from attackers or raiders. Much of the archaeology records from the 1930s excavation are poor or incomplete, and so it is not possible to date it from the layer in which it was found, nor to estimate the reasons or conditions of its original depositing. In addition, the site was ransacked for artefacts in the mid-19th century and suffered considerable damage.

A number of similarly styled mountings and fragments from smaller brooches have been found in the Ballinderry area.

== Description ==
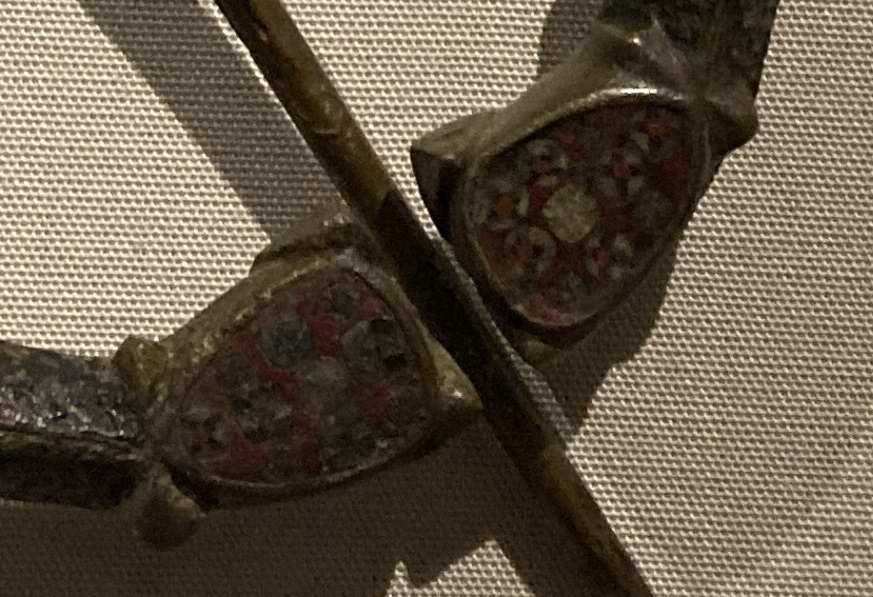
Detail of the zoomorphic terminals with sunken fields of red enamel and millefiori

The terminals are shaped as stylized animal heads, whose mouths (or snouts) face each other to form the opening gap for the pin, with small protuberances at these points indicating their ears. Both the terminals and the ring contain panels of red enamel and inlaid millefiori platelets with full and semi-circle patterns arranged in cross shapes. The concaved reverse of the terminals contain hexafoil designs lined with series of dots.

The arms of the ring are lined with thin series of lines, herringbone and hatchings which resemble tight strips of wire bindings. A pair of copper-alloy coils are banded loosely around the ring and may have functioned as additional fastening devices for cloth; each has a sharp and a blunt ending.

The reverse of the head contains soldered plates decorated with further engraved marigold designs. The reverse-side marigolds have led to the brooch's comparison to the marigold stone in Carndonagh, County Donegal, which also contains "the pattern of a geometrical stem rising towards a marigold flower".

== Sources ==
- Bruce-Mitford, Rupert; Scott, Leo; Raven, Sheila. "A Corpus of Late Celtic Hanging-bowls with an Account of the Bowls Found in Scandinavia". Oxford: Oxford University Press, 2015. ISBN 978-0-1981-3410-7
- Newman, Conor. "Ballinderry Crannóg No. 2, Co. Offaly: Pre-Crannóg Early Medieval Horizon". The Journal of Irish Archaeology, volume 11, 2002. JSTOR 30001660
- Newman, Conor. Iconographical analysis of the marigold Stone, Carndonagh, Inishowen, Co. Donegal. In: Moss, Rachel (ed.), "Making and meaning in Insular Art: 5th International Conference on Insular Art, 2005
- O'Neill Hencken, Hugh. "Ballinderry Crannog no. 2". Proceedings of the Royal Irish Academy, January 1, 1942. ASIN: B0007J79B2
- Ryan, Michael. In: Youngs, Susan (ed.), "The Work of Angels": Masterpieces of Celtic Metalwork, 6th—9th centuries AD. London: British Museum Press, 1989. ISBN 0-7141-0554-6
