= Raghnall Ó Floinn =

Irish archaeologist, curator and museum director (1953–2024)

Raghnall Ó Floinn, FSA (August 1953 – 10 December 2024) was an Irish archaeologist who was the director of the National Museum of Ireland. He joined its staff in 1976 and served as its director from 2013 to 2018.

== Biography ==
Born in August 1953, Ó Floinn studied at University College Dublin, attaining a Master of Arts in Celtic Archaeology in 1976, and joined the NMI that year as Assistant Keeper in the Irish Antiquities Division. He published a wide variety of books and papers on bog bodies, the archeology of the early Irish church, and insular art (particularly metalwork). He co-authored an overview of the museum's collection with his predecessor as NMI director, Pat Wallace.

He also acted as chairman of the Council of National Cultural Institutions, and a vice-chairman of the Society for Medieval Archaeology, London.

Ó Floinn died on 10 December 2024, at the age of 71.

== Selected publications ==
=== Books ===
- "Viking Graves and Grave-Goods in Ireland (Medieval Dublin Excavations 1962-81, Series B)" (2015). ISBN 978-0-9017-7799-7
- "Irish Shrines and Reliquaries of the Middle Ages (Irish treasures)" (2014). ISBN 978-0-9461-7240-5
- "Franciscan Faith: Sacred Art in Ireland, AD 1600-1750" (2011). ISBN 978-1-9055-6958-8
- "Treasures of the National Museum of Ireland: Irish Antiquities" (2002). Co-author with Patrick Wallace. ISBN 978-0-7171-2829-7

=== Monographs ===
- "The 'Shannon' shrine: a suggested provenance" (2015)
- "An Anglo-Saxon Disc-Brooch From Sjerring, Jutland" (2013)
- "Ireland and Scandinavia in the Early Viking Age" (1998)
- "A Fragmentary House-Shaped Shrine from Clonard, Co. Meath". The Journal of Irish Archaeology, volume 5. 1989/1990
- "In Ireland and Insular Art A.D. 500–1200". Proceedings of a Conference at University College Cork, 31 October–3 November 1985. Royal Irish Academy

== Bibliography ==
- Ó Floinn, Raghnall; Wallace, Patrick (eds). Treasures of the National Museum of Ireland: Irish Antiquities. National Museum of Ireland, 2002. ISBN 978-0-7171-2829-7
