= List of Hiberno-Saxon illuminated manuscripts =

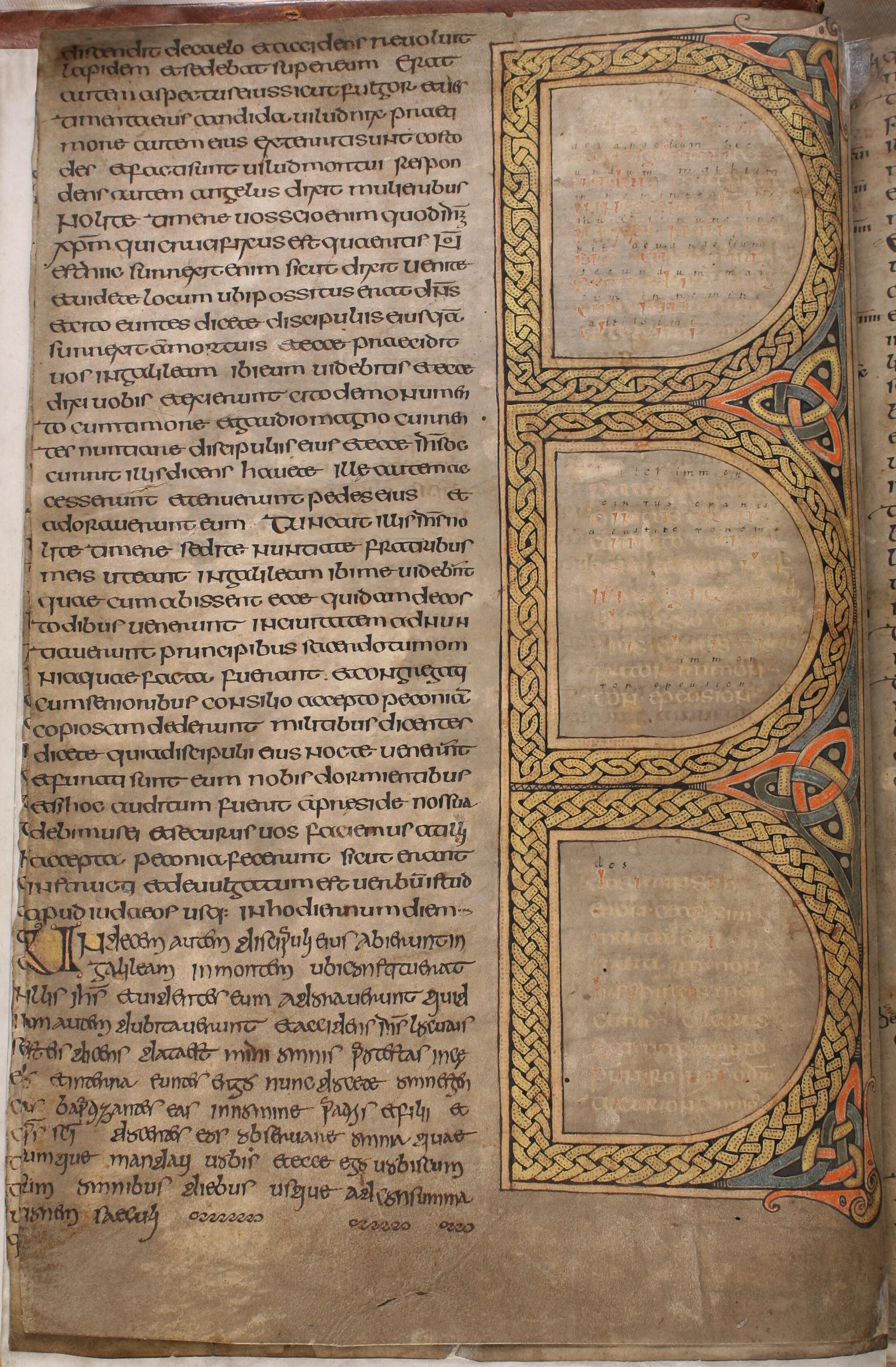
Colophon to Matthew in Durham Cathedral Library, MS A. II. 10.

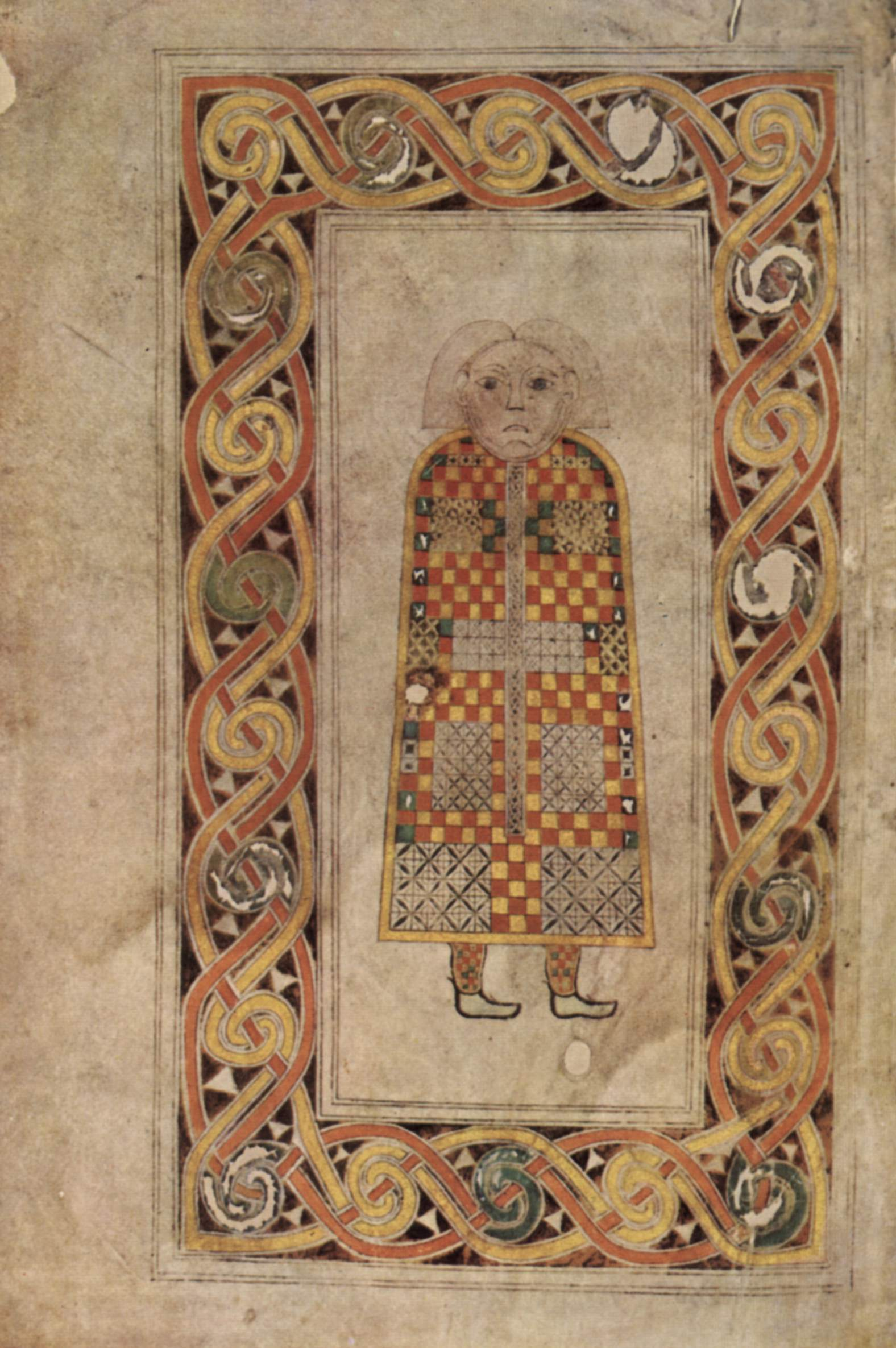
Evangelist symbol for Matthew, from the Book of Durrow.

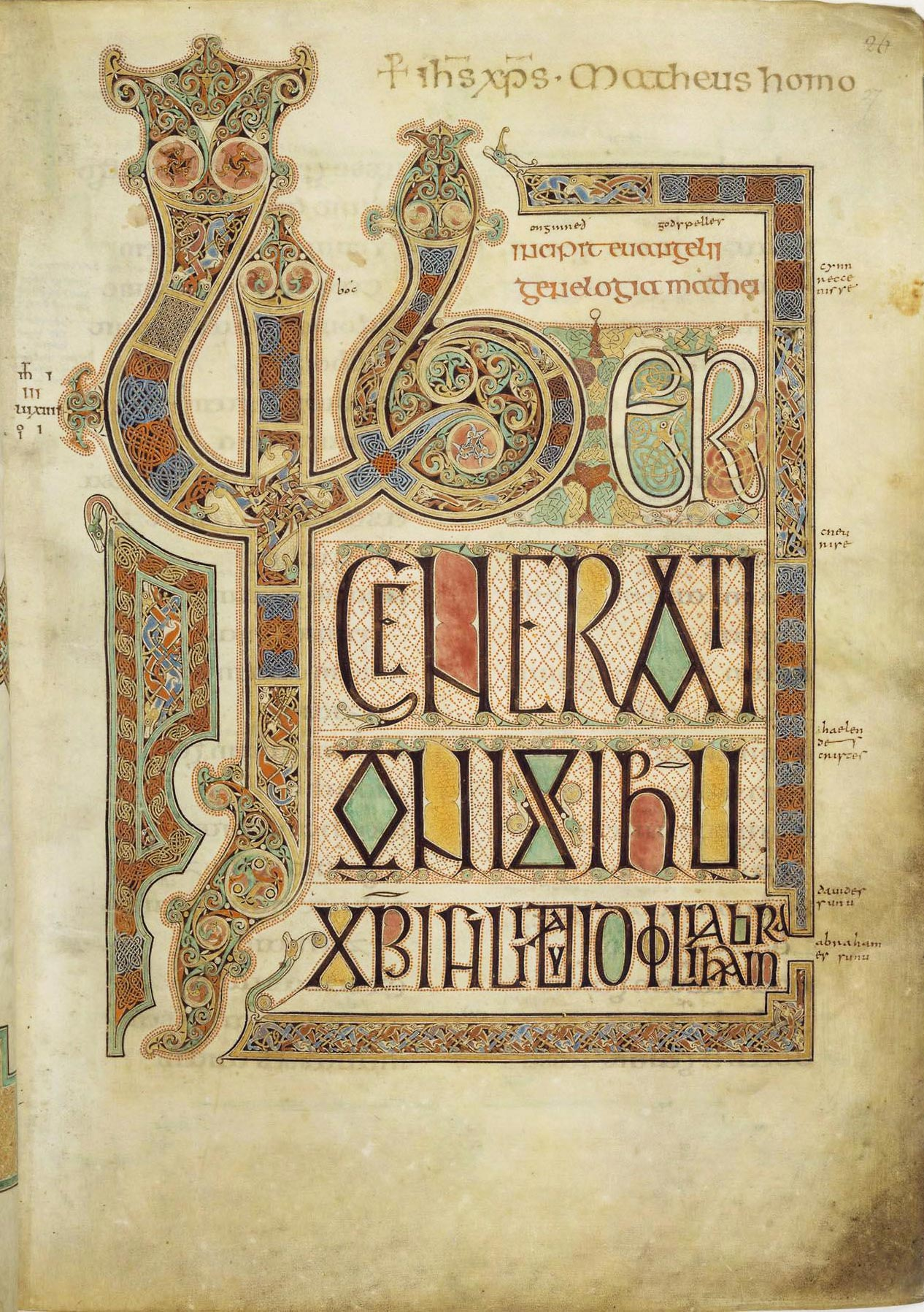
Folio 27r from the Lindisfarne Gospels contains the incipit Liber generationis of the Gospel of Matthew.

The symbol of Mark from the Echternach Gospels.

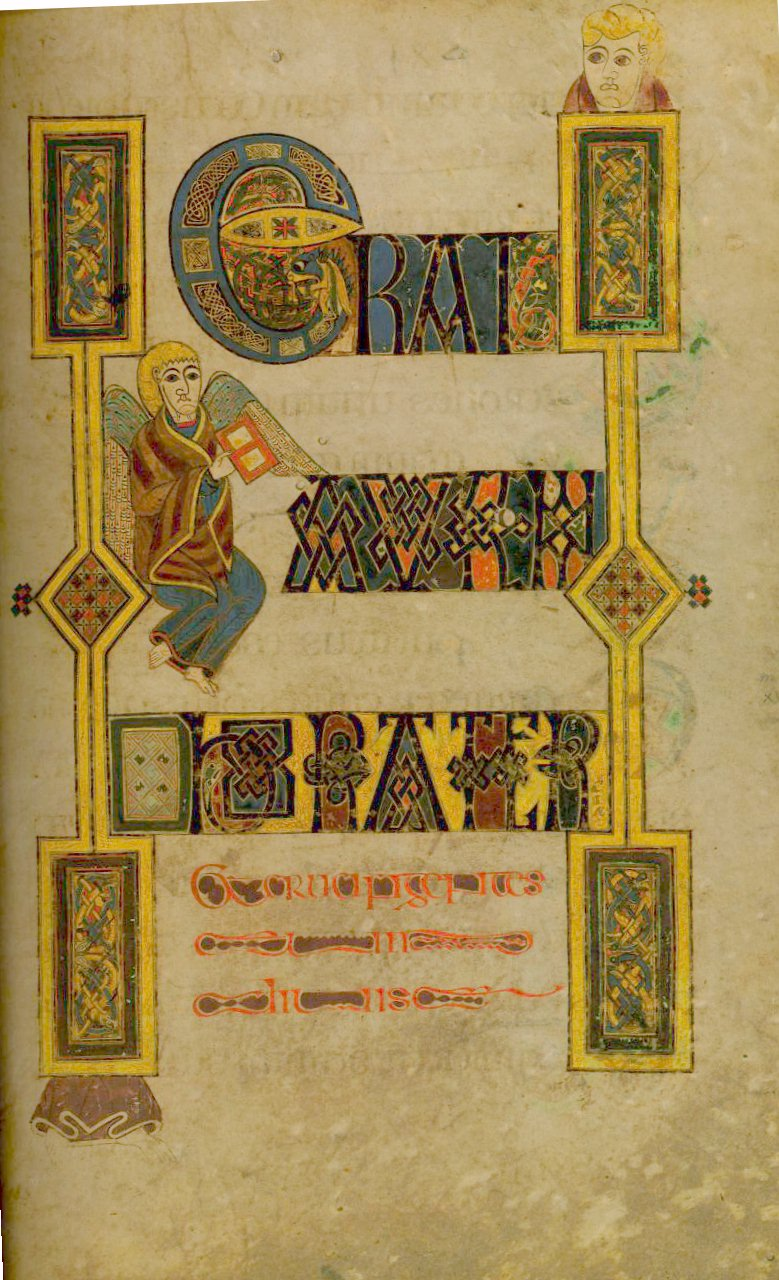
Folio 183r for the Book of Kells. Decorated text Erat autem hora tercia.

Hiberno-Saxon manuscripts are those manuscripts made in Ireland and Great Britain from about 500 to about 900 in England, but later in Ireland and elsewhere, or those manuscripts made on the continent in scriptoria founded by Hiberno-Scottish or Anglo-Saxon missionaries and which are stylistically similar to the manuscripts produced in Ireland and Britain. It is almost impossible to separate Anglo-Saxon, Irish, Scottish, and Welsh art at this period, especially in manuscripts; this art is therefore called Insular art. See specifically Insular illumination and also Insular script. For English manuscripts produced after 900, see the List of illuminated later Anglo-Saxon manuscripts.

- Antwerp Sedulius (Antwerp, Museum Plantin-Moretus MS M. 17. 4)
- Barberini Gospels (Rome, Vatican, Biblioteca Apostolica MS Barberini Lat. 570)
- Bibliothèque Nationale MS lat. 10861 Lives of Saints (Paris, Bibliothèque Nationale MS lat. 10861)
- Gospels of Saint Gatien of Tours (Paris, Bibliothèque Nationale MS. nouv. acq. lat. 1587)
- Ambrosiana Jerome (Milan, Biblioteca Ambrosiana MS S. 45. sup.)
- Ambrosiana Orosius (Milan, Biblioteca Ambrosiana MS D. 23. sup.)
- Bodleian Ovid (Oxford, Bodleian Library MS Auct. F. 4. 32, ff. 37-47 (S. C. 2176)
- Bodleian Philippus (Oxford, Bodleian Library MS Bodley 426 (S. C. 2327))
- Book of Armagh (Dublin, Trinity College Library, MS 52)
- Book of Cerne (Cambridge, University Library, MS L1. 1. 10)
- Book of Deer (Cambridge, University Library, MS II. 6. 32)
- Book of Dimma (Dublin, Trinity College Library MS A. 4. 23 (59))
- Book of Durrow (Dublin, Trinity College Library, MS A. 4. 5 (57))
- Book of Kells (Dublin, Trinity College Library, MS A I. 6. (58))
- Book of Mulling (Dublin, Trinity College Library MS A. I. 15 (60))
- Book of Nunnaminster (London, British Library Harley MS 2965)
- Gospel Book (London, British Library Add MS 40618)
- British Library Add MS 36929 Psalter (London, British Library Add MS 36929)
- British Library Harley MS 1023 Gospel Book (London, British Library Harley MS 1023)
- Gospels of Mael Brigte (London, British Library, Harley MS 1802)
- Cadmug Gospels (Fulda, Landesbibliothek Codex Bonifatianus 3)
- Canterbury Gospels (London, British Library Royal MS I. E. VI and Canterbury, Cathedral Library Additional MS 16)
- Cathach of St. Columba (Dublin, Royal Irish Academy, s. n.)
- Codex Amiatinus (Florence, Biblioteca Medicea Laurenziana MS Amiatinus 1)
- Codex Bigotianus (Paris, Bibliothèque Nationale MS lat. 281, 298)
- Codex Eyckensis (Maaseik, Church of Saint Catherine, Treasury, s.n.)
- Codex Usserianus Primus (Dublin, Trinity College Library, MS A. 4. 15 (55))
- Codex Usserianus Secundus (Garland of Howth) (Dublin, Trinity College MS A. 4. 6 (56))
- Cologne Collectio Canonum (Cologne, Dombibliothek Cod. 213)
- Cotton-Corpus Christi Gospel Fragment (Cambridge, Corpus Christi College MS 197B, ff. 1-36 (Formerly pp. 245–316) and London, British Library Cotton MS Otho C. V)
- Cuthbert Gospel of St John (Stonyhurst Gospel) British Library - for binding
- Cutbercht Gospels (Vienna, Österreichische Nationalbibliothek Cod. 1224)
- Durham Cassiodorus (Durham, Cathedral Library MS B. II. 30)
- Durham Cathedral Library A. II. 10. Gospel Book Fragment (Durham, Cathedral Library MSS A. II. 10 ff. 2-5, 338-8a, C. III. 13, ff. 192-5, and C. III. 20, ff. 1, 2)
- Durham Cathedral Library A. II. 16. Gospel Book Fragment (Durham Cathedral Library MSS A. II. 16, ff. 1-23, 34-86, 102 and Cambridge, Magdalene College Pepysian MS 2981 (18))
- Durham Gospels (Durham, Cathedral Library, MS A.II.17, 2-102 and Cambridge, Magdalene College Pepysian MS 2981 (19))
- Echternach Gospels (Paris, Bibliothèque Nationale, MS lat. 9389)
- Freiburg Gospel Book Fragment (Freiburg im Breisgau, Universitätsbibliothek Cod. 702)
- Gotha Gospels (Gotha, Forschungsbibliothek Cod. Memb I. 18)
- Harburg Gospels (Harburg über Donauwörth, Schloss Harburg, Fürstlich Ottingen-Wallersteinsche Bibliothek Cod. I. 2. 4. 2 (Olin Maihingen))
- Hereford Gospels (Hereford, Cathedral Library MS P. I. 2)
- Karlsruhe Bede (Karlsruhe, Landesbibliothek Cod. CLXVII)
- Leiden Pliny (Leiden, Universiteitsbibliotheek MS Voss. lat. F. 4, ff. 4-33)
- Leiden Priscian (Leiden, Universiteitsbibliotheek MS. B. P. L. 67)
- Leipzig Gospel Book Fragment (Leipzig, Universitätsbibliothek MSS Rep. I, 58a and Rep. 35a)
- Leningrad Bede (Leningrad, Public Library Cod. Q. v. I. 18)
- Leningrad Gospels (Leningrad, Public Library Cod. F. v. I. 8)
- Leningrad Paulinus (Leningrad, Public Library Cod. Q. v. XIV. 1)
- Lichfield Gospels (Book of St. Chad) (Lichfield, Cathedral Library)
- Lindisfarne Gospels (London, British Library, Cotton MS Nero D. IV)
- Lothian Psalter (Blickling Psalter) (New York, Morgan Library & Museum MS M. 776)
- Macdurnan Gospels (London, Lambeth Palace MS 1370)
- MacRegol Gospels (Rushworth Gospels) (Oxford, Bodleian Library MS Auct. D. 2. 19 (S. C. 3946))
- Milan Theodore (Milan, Biblioteca Ambrosiana C. 301. inf.)
- Rawlinson Gospels (Oxford, Bodleian Library MS Rawlinson G. 167 (S.C. no. 14890))
- Ricemarch Psalter (Dublin, Trinity College MS A. 4. 20 (50))
- Royal Gospel Book (London, British Library Royal MS I. B. VII)
- Royal Irish Academy MS D. II. 3 Gospel of St. John (Dublin, Royal Irish Academy MS D. II. 3, ff. 1-11)
- Royal Prayer Book (London, British Library Royal MS 2.A.XX)
- Salaberga Psalter (Berlin, Staatsbibliothek zu Berlin - Preußischer Kulturbesitz MS Hamilton 553)
- Southampton Psalter (Cambridge, St. John's College MS C. 9 (59))
- St. Gall Gospel Book (St. Gall, Stiftsbibliothek Cod. 51)
- St. Gall Gospel of St. John (St. Gall, Stiftsbibliothek Cod. 60)
- St. Gall Priscian (St. Gall, Stiftsbibliothek Cod. 904)
- Stockholm Codex Aureus (Stockholm, Royal Library MS A. 135)
- Stonyhurst Gospel - for binding
- Stowe Missal (Dublin, Royal Irish Academy MS D. II. 3, ff. 12-67)
- Stuttgart Psalter (Stuttgart, Württembergische Landesbibliothek Cod. Bibl. 2. 12)
- Tiberius Bede (London, British Library Cotton MS Tiberius C. II)
- Trier Gospels (Trier, Domschatz Codex 61 (Bibliotheksnummer 134))
- Turin Gospel Book Fragment (Turin, Biblioteca Nazionale Cod. O. IV. 20)
- Utrecht Gospel Book Fragment (Utrecht, Universiteitsbibliotheek MS 32 (Script. eccl. 484, ff. 94-105)
- Valenciennes Apocalypse (Valenciennes, Bibliothèque Municipale MS 99)
- Vespasian Psalter (London, British Library Cotton MS Vespasian A. I)
- Vitellius Psalter (London, British Library Cotton MS Vitellius F. XI)
- Wurzburg St. Paul (Würzburg, Universitätsbibliothek Cod. M. p. th. F. 69)
