= Tiberius Bede =

Illustrated manuscript of Bede's Ecclesiastical History

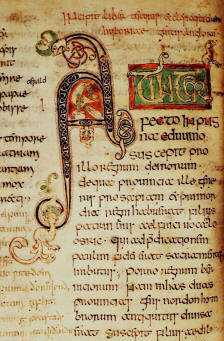
A decorated initial A from folio 60v of the Tiberius Bede.

British Library, MS Cotton Tiberius C. II, or the Tiberius Bede, is an 8th-century illuminated manuscript of Bede's Historia ecclesiastica gentis Anglorum.

== Characteristics ==
The Tiberius Bede is one of only four surviving 8th-century manuscripts of Bede, another of which happens to be MS Cotton Tiberius A. XIV, produced at Monkwearmouth–Jarrow Abbey. As such it is one of the closest texts to Bede's autograph. The manuscript has 155 vellum folios. This manuscript may have been the Latin text on which the Alfredian Old English translation of Bede's Ecclesiastical History was based. The manuscript is decorated with zoomorphic initials in a partly Insular and partly Continental style.

The manuscript has given its name to the 'Tiberius' group of manuscripts, connected on stylistic grounds and sometimes also known as the 'Canterbury' group, though the region of their production remains unknown – Mercia has also been suggested. Apart from the Tiberius Bede, the group includes: Vespasian Psalter, Stockholm Codex Aureus, Barberini Gospels, Book of Cerne, Blickling Psalter, Codex Bigotianus (BnF MS lat. 281, 298), Royal Bible (British Library MS Royal 1.E.vi), Royal Prayerbook, Book of Nunnaminster, Harleian Prayerbook, Saint Petersburg Gospels, Anglian collection manuscript V (British Library MS Cotton Vespasian B.vi, folios 104–109), BnF MS lat. 10861, Bodleian Library MS Hatton 93, Salisbury Cathedral Library MS 117, and a number of other manuscripts.

== Facsimiles ==
- British Library digitisation
