= Blickling Psalter =

Blickling Psalter, also known as Lothian Psalter, is an 8th-century Insular illuminated manuscript containing a Roman Psalter with two additional sets of Old English glosses. The manuscript is in the collection of the Morgan Library & Museum in New York, MS M.776.

The earlier of the two sets is the oldest surviving English translation of the Bible, albeit a very fragmentary one. It consists of 26 glosses, either interlinear or marginal, scattered throughout the manuscript. These so-called "red glosses" are written by a single scribe mostly in red ink in what is known as West Saxon minuscule, an Insular script found, for example, in charters of Æthelwulf, King of Wessex from 839 to 858. The glosses were first published in by E. Brock in 1876. A number of corrections were subsequently offered by Henry Sweet in 1885, and by Karl Wildhagen in 1913.

Only some of the psalms originally contained in the Blickling Psalter survive: Psalms 31.3–36.15 on folios 1–5, Psalms 36.39–50.19 on folios 6–16, and Psalm 9.9–30 on folio 64.

The Psalter is sometimes included in the Tiberius group, a group of manuscripts from Southern England stylistically related to the Tiberius Bede (such as Vespasian Psalter, Stockholm Codex Aureus, Barberini Gospels and Book of Cerne).

The Psalter was in the library at Blickling Hall until 1932, when it was auctioned by Philip Kerr, 11th Marquess of Lothian at the American Art Association where it was bought by A. S. W. Rosenbach, who sold it to the Morgan Library.

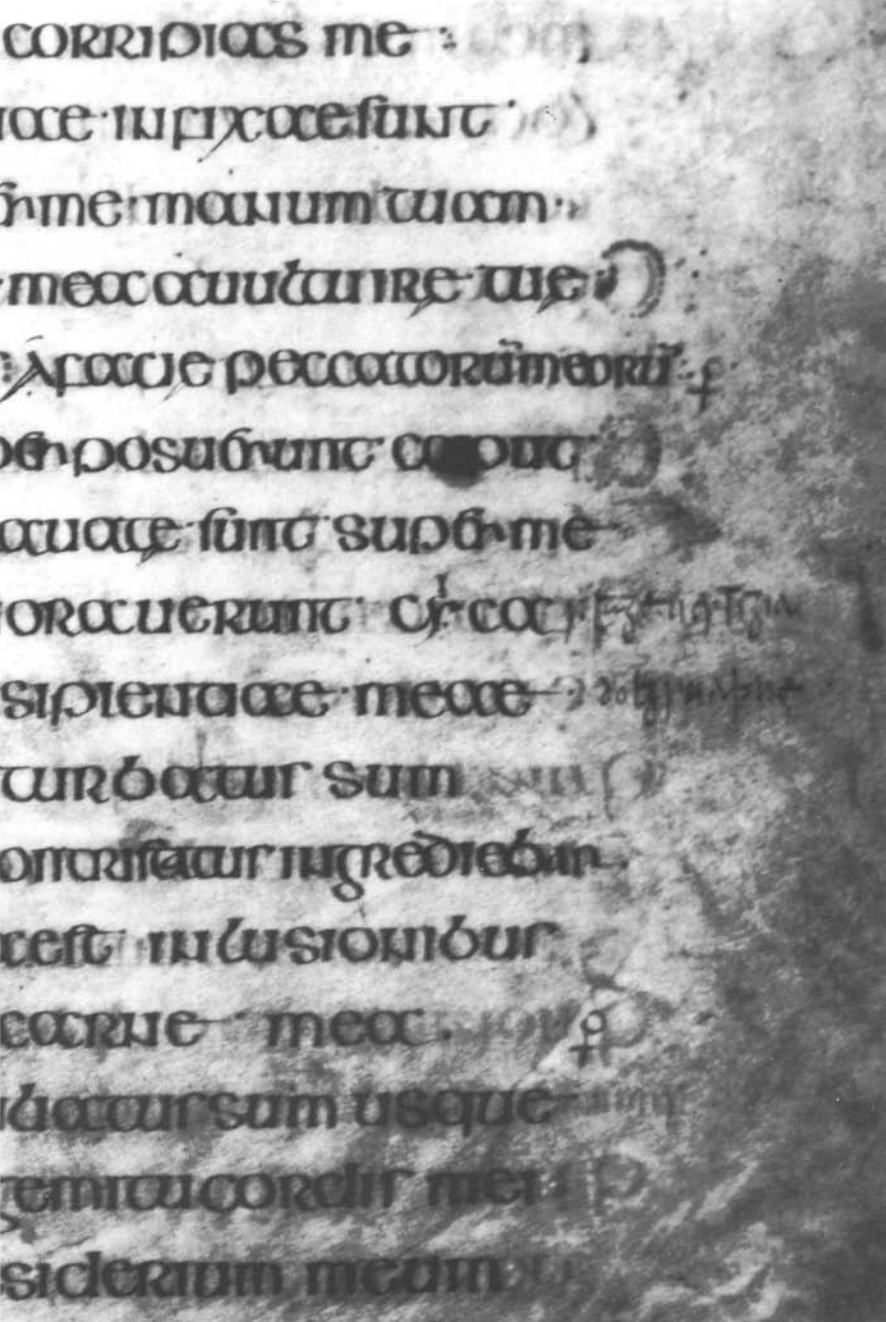
Blickling Psalter, folio 6r, detail, with an early-9th-century Old English gloss in the right margin

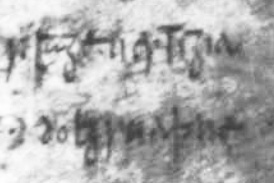
Blickling Psalter, folio 6r, right margin: early-9th-century Latin / Old English gloss plagę. uestigia dolgsuaþhe, for Latin cicatrices

== See also ==
- Old English Bible translations
