= Vespasian Psalter =

8th century Anglo-Saxon psalm book

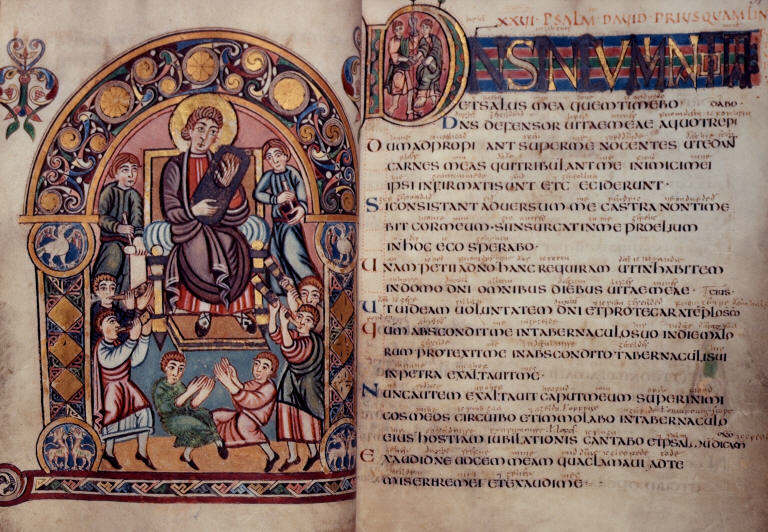
King David with his musicians; start of Psalm 27

The Vespasian Psalter (London, British Library, Cotton Vespasian A.i) is an Anglo-Saxon illuminated psalter decorated in a partly Insular style produced in the second or third quarter of the 8th century. It contains an interlinear gloss in Old English which is the oldest extant English translation of any portion of the Bible. It was produced in southern England, perhaps in St. Augustine's Abbey or Christ Church, Canterbury or Minster-in-Thanet, and is the earliest illuminated manuscript produced in "Southumbria" to survive.

The Psalter belongs to a group of manuscripts from Southern England known as the Tiberius group, also including the Stockholm Codex Aureus, Barberini Gospels, the Book of Cerne, the Tiberius Bede, and the Book of Nunnaminster.

== Description ==
The psalter contains the Book of Psalms together with letters of St. Jerome, hymns and canticles. The main scribe was also the artist of the miniatures. It was written in Latin on vellum, using a southern English Uncial script with Rustic Capital rubrics. There were additions made by a scribe named Eadui Basan in an English Carolingian minuscule. The English gloss was written in a Southumbrian pointed minuscule.

The codex is 235 by 180 mm 9.25 by 7.1 in. The text is written in an area of about 175 by 135 mm or 6.9 by 5.3 in. There are 160 folios.

There are several major initials which are historiated, zoomorphic, or decorated. Major initials are found at the beginning of Psalms 1, 51 and 101. This tripartite division is typical of Insular Psalters. In addition, the psalms beginning each of the liturgical divisions of the Psalter are given major initials. The beginning letters of the other Psalms have smaller "minor" initials which are decorated or zoomorphic and are done in what is called the "antenna" style.

The only surviving full-page miniature shows King David with his court musicians, and is now folio 30 verso. It is possible that this miniature was originally the frontispiece or opening miniature of the psalter, and that a decorated incipit page at the start of the Psalms is missing, as well as a carpet page at the end. Sir Robert Cotton pasted a cutting from the Breviary of Margaret of York on folio 160 verso. He also inserted a miniature from a 13th-century liturgical psalter as folio 1.

== History ==
The manuscript was produced during the second quarter of the 8th century, and probably the earliest of the Tiberius group. The script of the Old English gloss is typical of the script produced in Canterbury scriptoria from about 820 to 850. Eadui Basan, who made additions to the manuscript, was a monk at Christ Church, Canterbury during the early 11th century. Thomas of Elmham recorded a Psalter at Canterbury which may have been the Vespasian Psalter.

The manuscript was at Canterbury in 1553. By 1556 it was owned by Sir William Cecil, who lent it to Matthew Parker, Archbishop of Canterbury. By 1599 it was the possession of Sir Robert Cotton, who signed it on folio 12 recto. It became national property, along with the rest of the Cotton library in 1702 and was incorporated into the British Museum when it was founded in 1753. The volume was the first in the Vespasian shelf section in the part of the library indexed by the names from a set of busts of the Roman Emperors on top of the shelves.
