= Stockholm Codex Aureus =

Eighth century illuminated gospel book

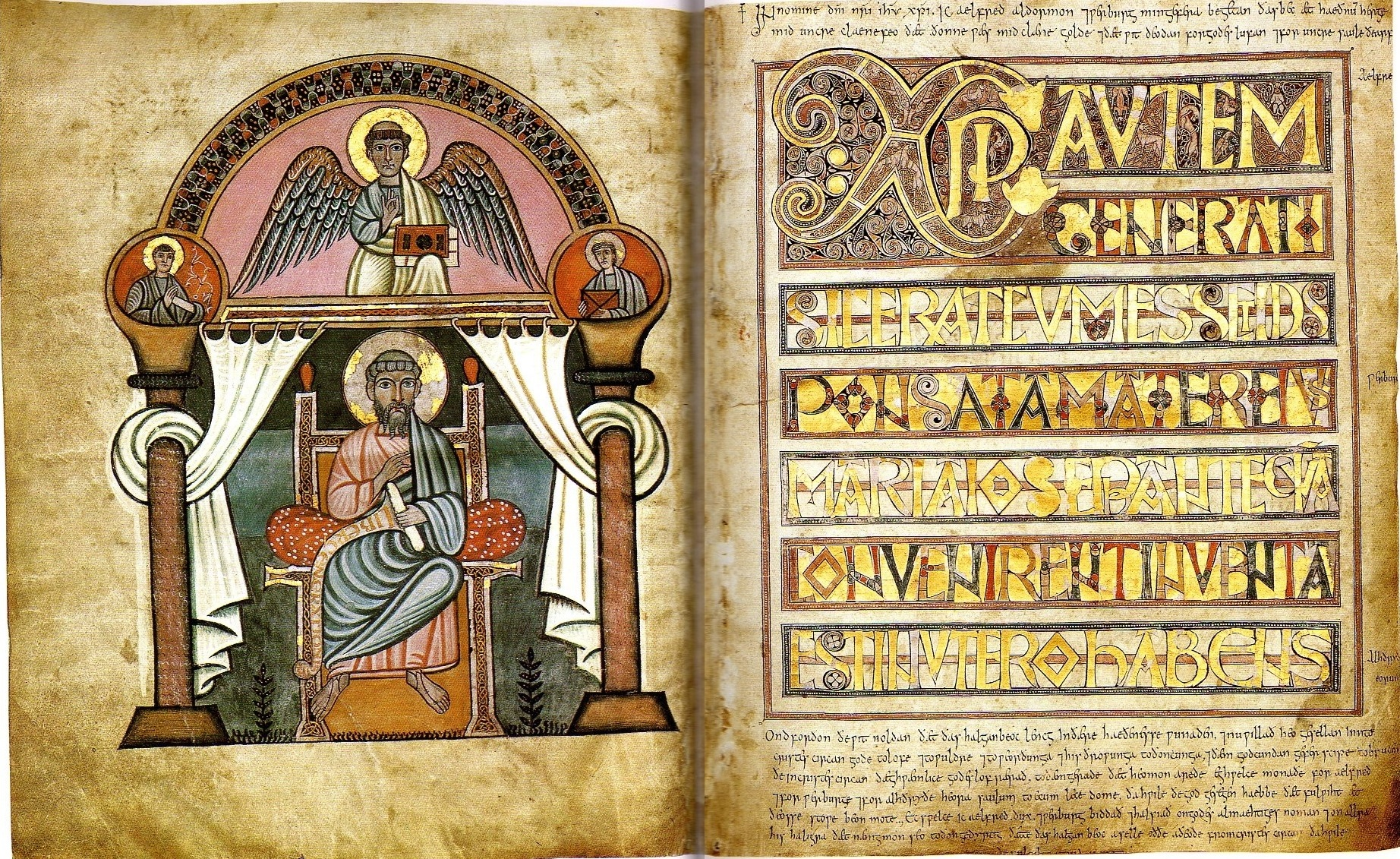
Folios 9 verso with portrait of Matthew, and folio 11 recto with decorated text of the Gospel of Matthew starting at Matthew 1:18 (fuller images: left and right.

The Stockholm Codex Aureus (Stockholm, National Library of Sweden, MS A. 135, also known as the Codex Aureus of Canterbury and Codex Aureus Holmiensis) is a Gospel book written in the mid-eighth century in Southumbria, probably in Canterbury, whose decoration combines Insular and Italian elements. Southumbria produced a number of important illuminated manuscripts during the eighth and early ninth centuries, including the Vespasian Psalter, the Stockholm Codex Aureus, three Mercian prayer books (the Royal Prayer book, the Book of Nunnaminster and the Book of Cerne), the Tiberius Bede and the British Library's Royal Bible.

== Description ==
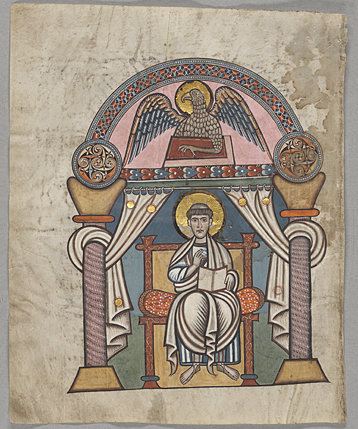
Evangelist portrait of Saint John

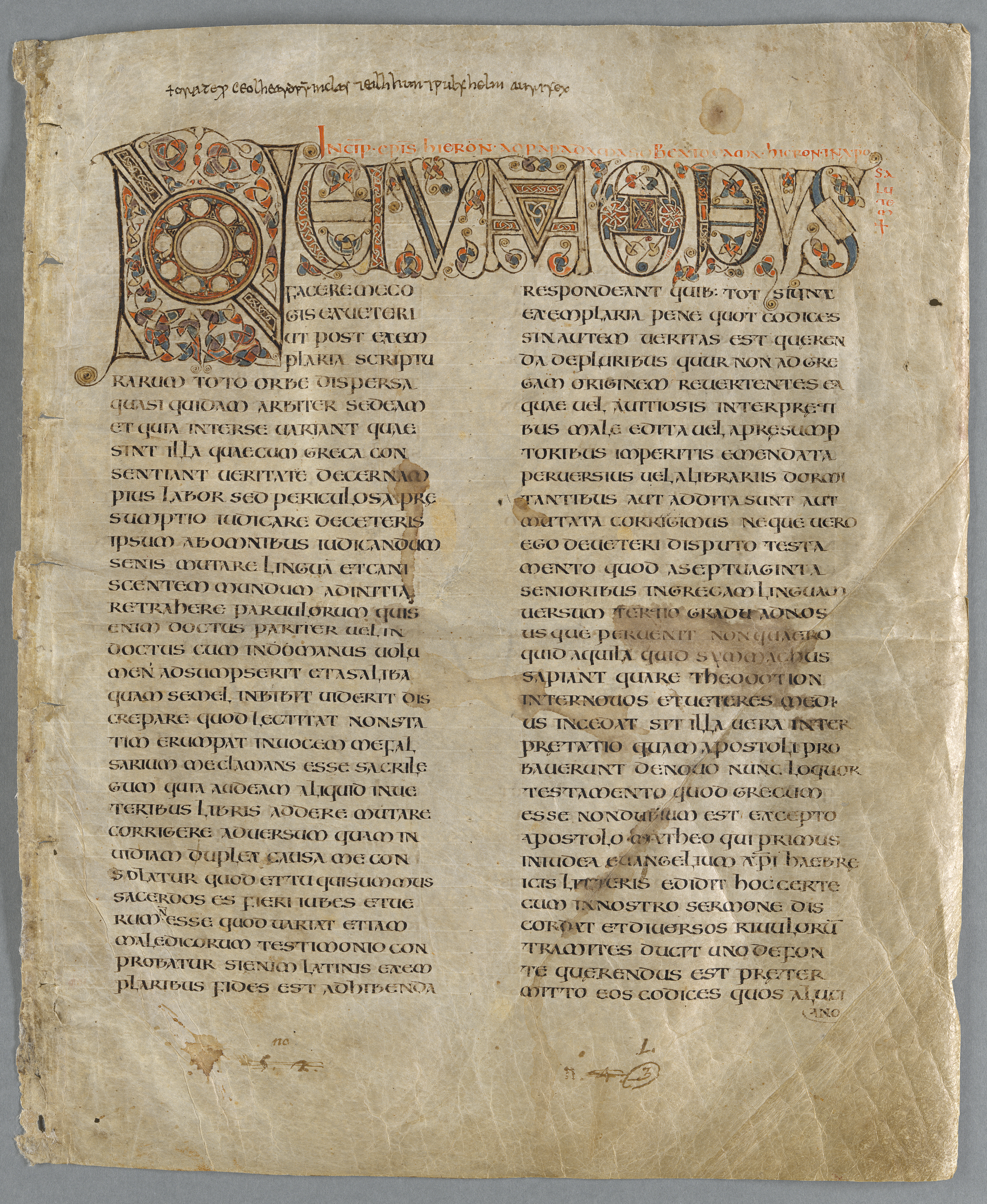
First page

The manuscript has 193 surviving folios which measure 395 by 314 mm (15.6 by 12.4 in). It contains the text of the four Gospels in Latin written in an uncial script on vellum leaves that alternately are dyed purple and undyed. The purple-dyed leaves are written with gold, silver, and white pigment, the undyed ones with black ink and red pigment. On some folios, the differing colours of ink are arranged to form geometric patterns. Purple parchment was, in the Roman and Byzantine Empires, reserved for Imperial manuscripts, and in the West reserved for the grandest commissions, and often only seen on a few pages.

The illustration programme includes two surviving evangelist portraits, six canon tables and seven large decorated initials. The manuscript is the oldest surviving example of initials decorated with gold leaf. The style is a blend of Insular art, as in the Chi-Rho initial shown, and Mediterranean traditions, possibly including some from early Carolingian art. In the opening shown at the start of Matthew the evangelist portrait to the left is in a consistent adaptation of Italian style, probably closely following some lost model, though adding interlace to the chair frame, while the text page to the right is mainly in Insular style, especially in the first line, with its vigorous Celtic spirals and interlace. The following lines revert to a quieter style more typical of Frankish manuscripts of the period. Yet the same artist almost certainly produced both pages, and is very confident in both styles. The other surviving evangelist portrait of John includes roundels with Celtic spiral decoration probably drawn from the enamelled escutcheons of hanging bowls. This is one of the so-called "Tiberius group" of manuscripts, which leant towards the Italian style, and appear to be associated with Kent, or perhaps the kingdom of Mercia in the heyday of the Mercian Supremacy. It is, in the usual chronology, the last English manuscript in which "developed trumpet spiral patterns" are found.

== History ==
An inscription asks for prayers for four individuals, one a goldsmith (Wulfhelm). The others are Ceolhard, Niclas and Ealhhun, who were presumably the monks responsible for creating the manuscript and the elaborate metalwork cover it no doubt originally possessed. In the late ninth century it was looted by a Viking army and Ealdorman Aelfred (Alfred), ealdorman of Surrey, had to pay a ransom to get it back. Above and below the Latin text of the Gospel of St. Matthew is an added inscription in Old English recording how the manuscript was ransomed from a Viking army who had stolen it on one of their raids in Kent by Alfred, and given to Christ Church, Canterbury. It reads:

"In the name of our Lord Jesus Christ. I, Ealdorman Alfred and Wærburh my wife obtained these books from the heathen army with our pure money, that was with pure gold, and this we did for the love of God and for the benefit of our souls and because we did not wish these holy books to remain longer in heathen possession. And now they wish to give them to Christ Church to the praise and glory and honour of God..."

In the sixteenth and seventeenth centuries it was in Spain, and in 1690 it was bought for the Swedish royal collection. It is now kept in the National Library of Sweden.

== See also ==
- List of New Testament Latin manuscripts
