= Gospel Book =

Codex containing one or more of the Gospels

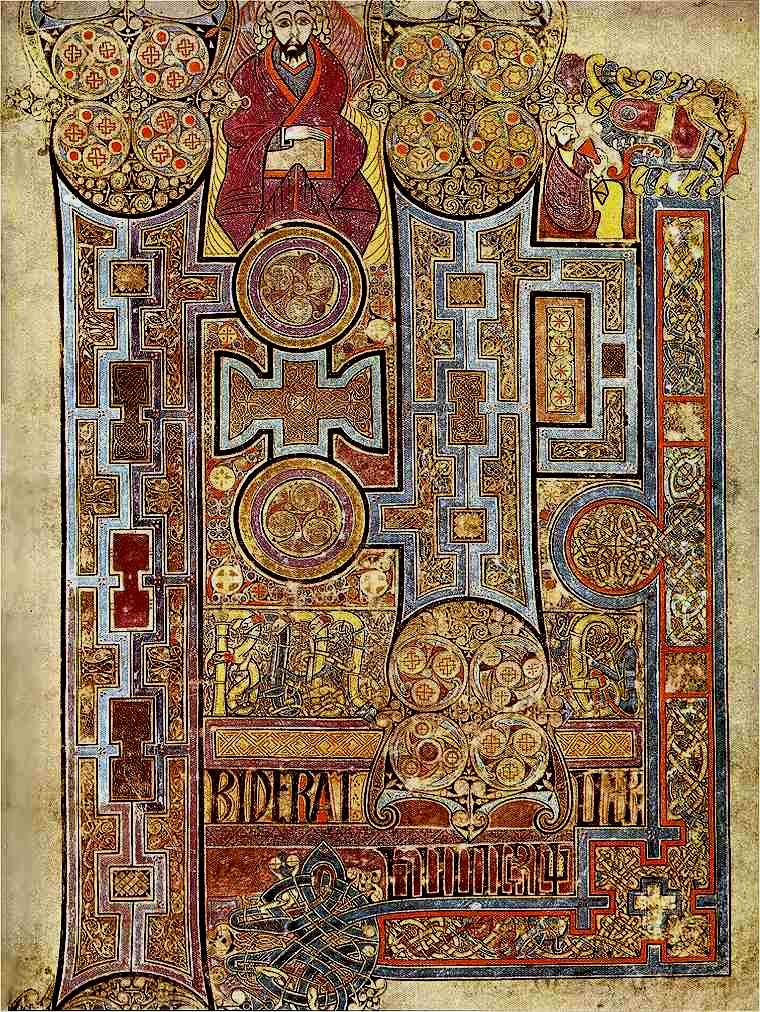
The Book of Kells, c. 800, an illuminated manuscript showing the lavishly decorated text that opens the Gospel of John.

A Gospel Book, Evangelion, or Book of the Gospels (Greek: Εὐαγγέλιον, Evangélion) is a codex or bound volume containing one or more of the four Gospels of the Christian New Testament – normally all four – centering on the life of Jesus of Nazareth and the roots of the Christian faith. The term is also used for a liturgical book, also called the Evangeliary, from which are read the portions of the Gospels used in the Mass and other services, arranged according to the order of the liturgical calendar.

Liturgical use in churches of a distinct Gospel book remains normal, often compulsory, in Eastern Christianity, and very common in Roman Catholicism and some parts of Anglicanism and Lutheranism.

== History ==
Folio 72 verso of the Codex Aureus of Lorsch. Christ in Majesty

In the Middle Ages, the production of copies of the Bible in its entirety was rare because of the huge expense of the parchment required. Individual books or collections of books were produced for specific purposes. From the 4th century Gospel Books were produced for liturgical use, as well as private study and as "display books" for ceremonial and ornamental purposes. The Codex Washingtonianus (Freer gospels) is an early example of a book containing only the four gospels, in Greek, written in the 4th or 5th century. By the 7th century particular gospel texts were allocated to days in the liturgical calendar; previously gospel readings had often worked through the books in sequence. Many of these volumes were elaborate; the Gospel Book was the most common form of heavily illuminated manuscript until about the 11th century, when the Romanesque Bible and Psalter largely superseded it in the West. In the East they remained a significant subject for illumination until the arrival of printing. The Evangelist portrait was a particular feature of their decoration. Most of the masterpieces of both Insular and Ottonian illumination are Gospel Books.

But most Gospel Books were never illuminated at all, or only with decorated initials and other touches. They often contained, in addition to the text of the Gospels themselves, supporting texts including Canon Tables, summaries, glossaries, and other explanatory material. Latin books often include the Letter of Jerome to Pope Damasus where Jerome set out to the Pope the reasoning behind his new Vulgate translation and arrangement of the texts, and many Greek ones the Epistula ad Carpianum (Letter to Carpian) of Eusebius of Caesarea explaining the Eusebian Canons he had devised.

Luxuriously illuminated gospel books were mainly a feature of the Early Middle Ages, as the evangeliary or a general lectionary gradually became more common for liturgical use, and other texts became most favoured for elaborate decoration.

== Western use ==
=== Roman Catholicism ===
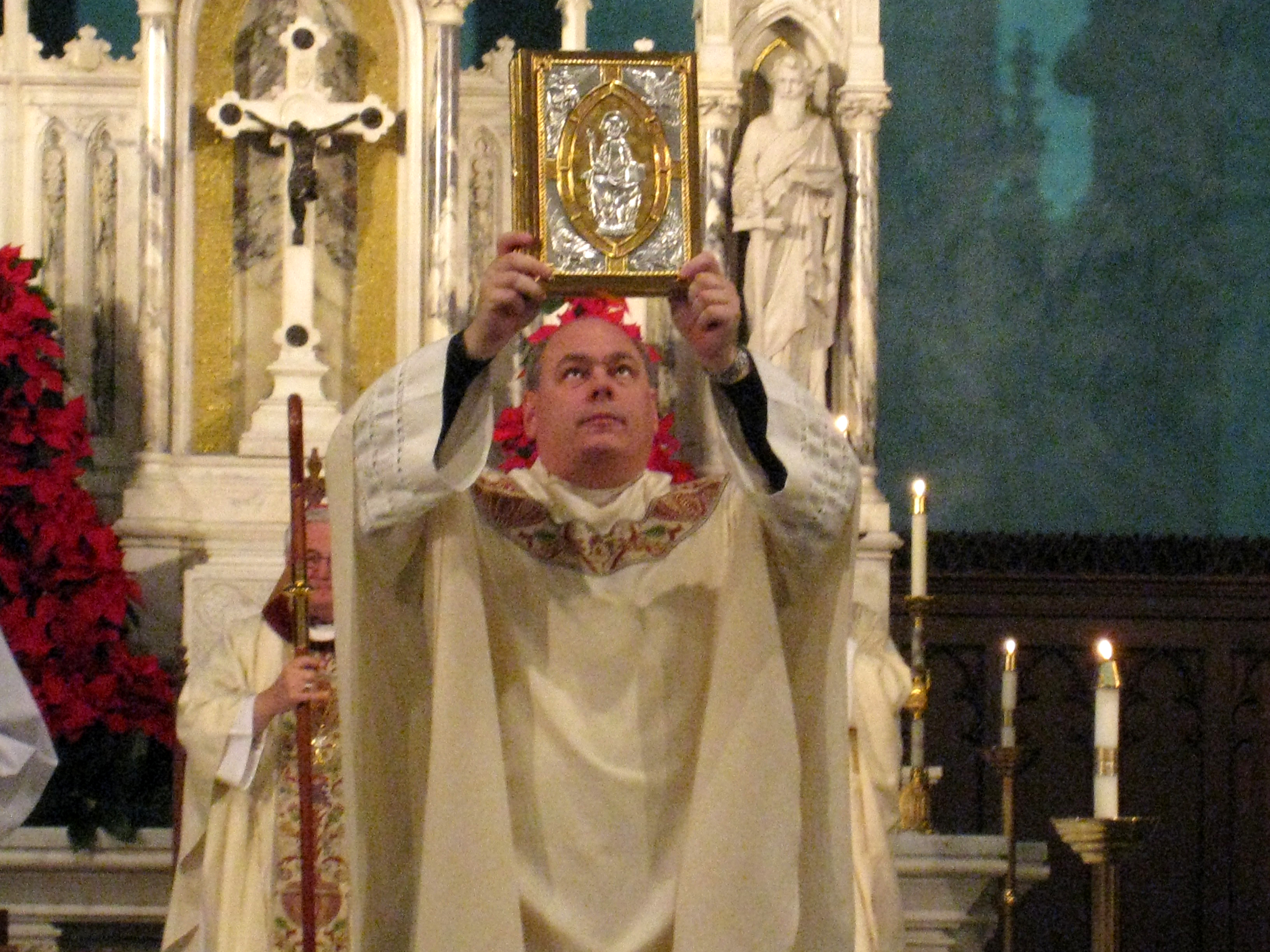
2008 Midnight Mass at The Cathedral of Saint Peter the Apostle in Jackson, MS

In current Roman Catholic usage, the Book of the Gospels or Evangeliary contains the full text of the passages from all four gospels that the deacon or priest is to read or chant at Mass in the course of the liturgical year. However, use of the Book of the Gospels is not mandatory, and the gospel readings are also included in the standard Lectionary.

The Book of the Gospels, if used, is brought to the altar in the entrance procession, while the Lectionary may not be. When carried in procession, the Book of the Gospels is held slightly elevated, though not over the head. It is particularly proper for the deacon to carry the Book of the Gospels in procession, as the reading of the gospel is his particular province. When there is no deacon, the Book may be carried by a lector. Upon reaching the altar, the deacon or lector bows in veneration of the altar, then places the Book upon the altar, where it remains until the Alleluia.

During the singing of the Alleluia, the deacon (who before proclaiming the gospel receives the presiding priest's blessing), or in his absence, a priest, removes the Book from the altar and processes with it to the ambo. If incense is used, the Book of the Gospels is censed by the deacon before the reading or chanting. An altar server or acolyte will swing the censer slowly during the reading or chanting. The Book of the Gospels remains on the ambo until the Mass concludes, unless it is taken to a bishop to be kissed, after which it may be placed on the credence table or another appropriate and dignified place.

=== Lutheranism ===
In the Lutheran Churches, the Book of the Gospels is "carried in procession".

=== Anglicanism ===
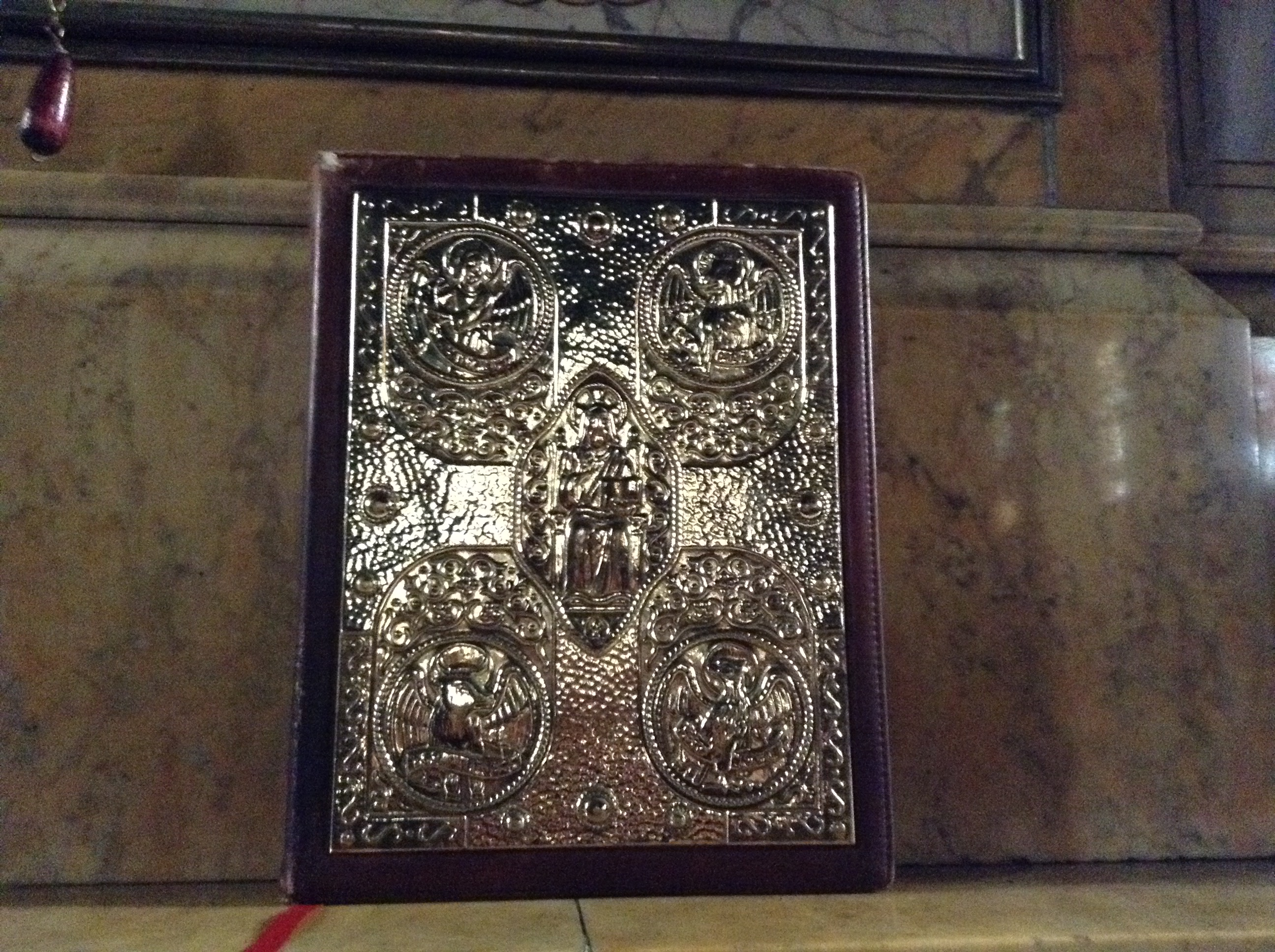
The Gospel Book at St. Mary's Episcopal Church.

In the Episcopal Church in the United States, the practice of using a Gospel Book was recovered with the 1979 Book of Common Prayer, which suggests that the lessons and gospel "be read from a book or books of appropriate size and dignity".

== Eastern use ==
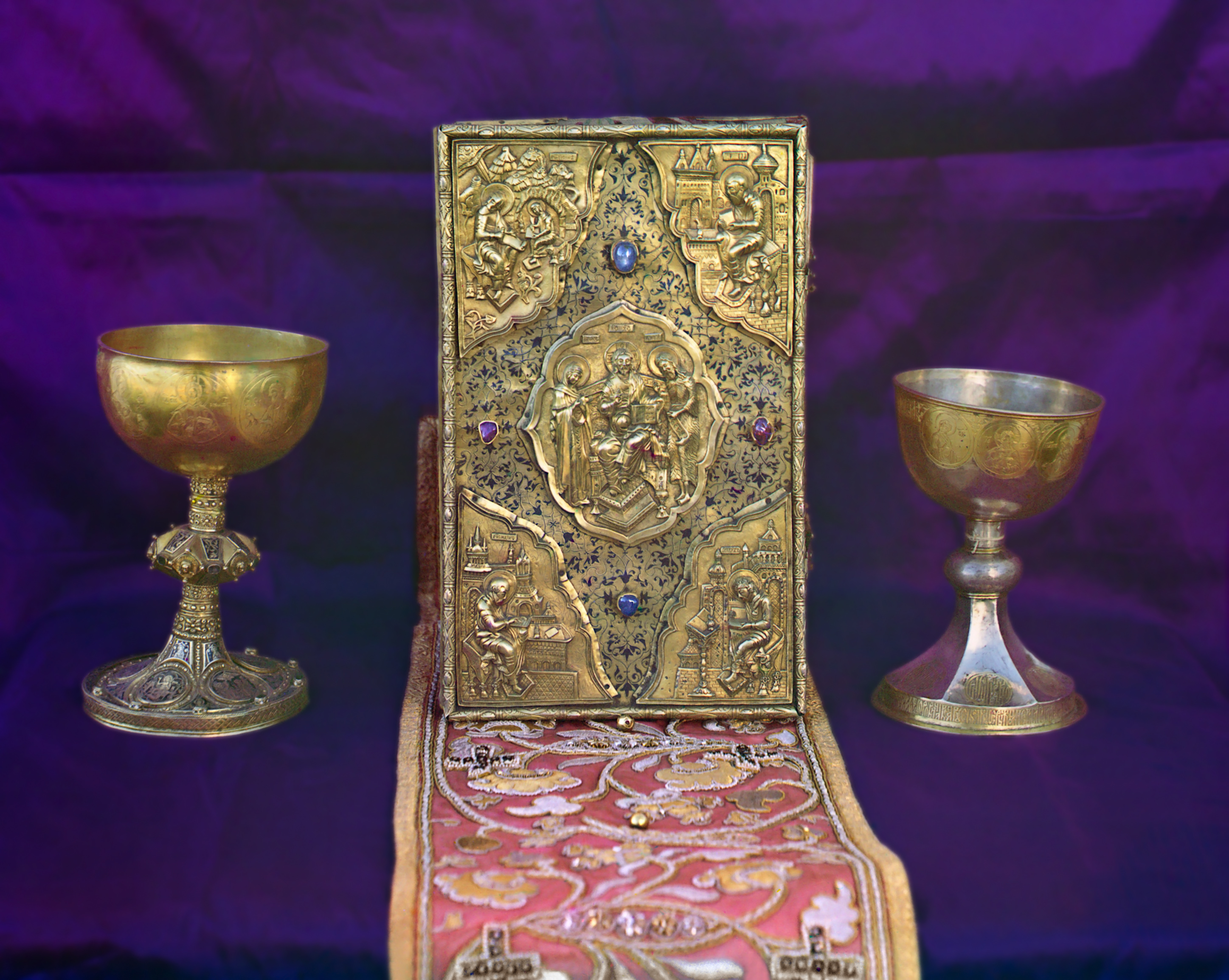
Jewelled and enamelled Gospel book belonging to Tsar Aleksei Mikhailovich (Trinity Monastery, Aleksandrov).

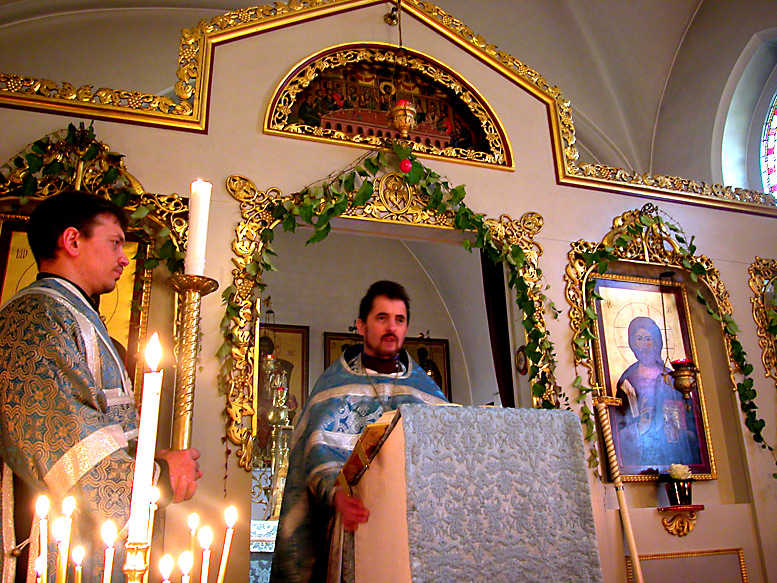
Reading the Gospel during the Divine Liturgy.

== Significant gospel books ==
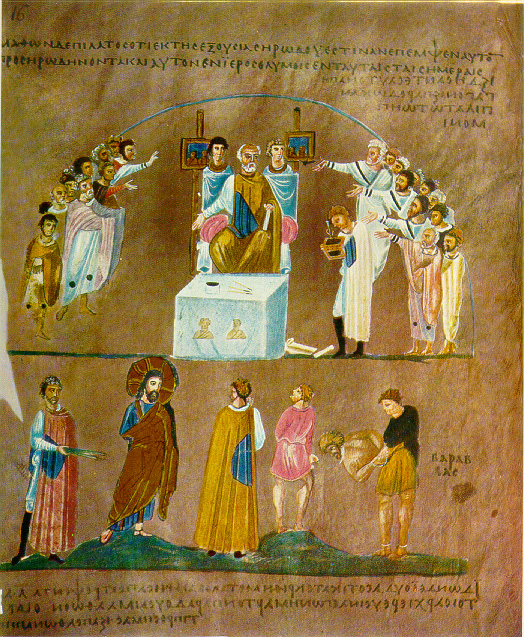
Illuminated page from the 6th century Rossano Gospels, one of the oldest extant Gospel Books.

See also the categories at bottom.

- Rossano Gospels
- Rabula Gospels
- Mulling Gospels
- Book of Durrow
- Domnach Airgid
- Echternach Gospels
- St. Augustine Gospels
- Stonyhurst or St Cuthbert Gospel (St John only)
- Durham Gospels
- Lindisfarne Gospels
- Lichfield Gospels (also known as the St. Chad Gospels)
- Leningrad Gospels
- Book of Kells
- Barberini Gospels
- Vienna Coronation Gospels
- Aachen Coronation Gospels
- Ada Gospels
- Ebbo Gospels
- Codex Aureus of St. Emmeram
- Lorsch Gospels
- Codex Aureus of Echternach
- Emperor's Bible
- Gospels of Henry the Lion
- Miroslav Gospels
- Gospels of Tsar Ivan Alexander
- Peresopnytsia Gospels
