= St. Mary's Episcopal Church (Kansas City, Missouri) =

Historic church in Missouri, United States

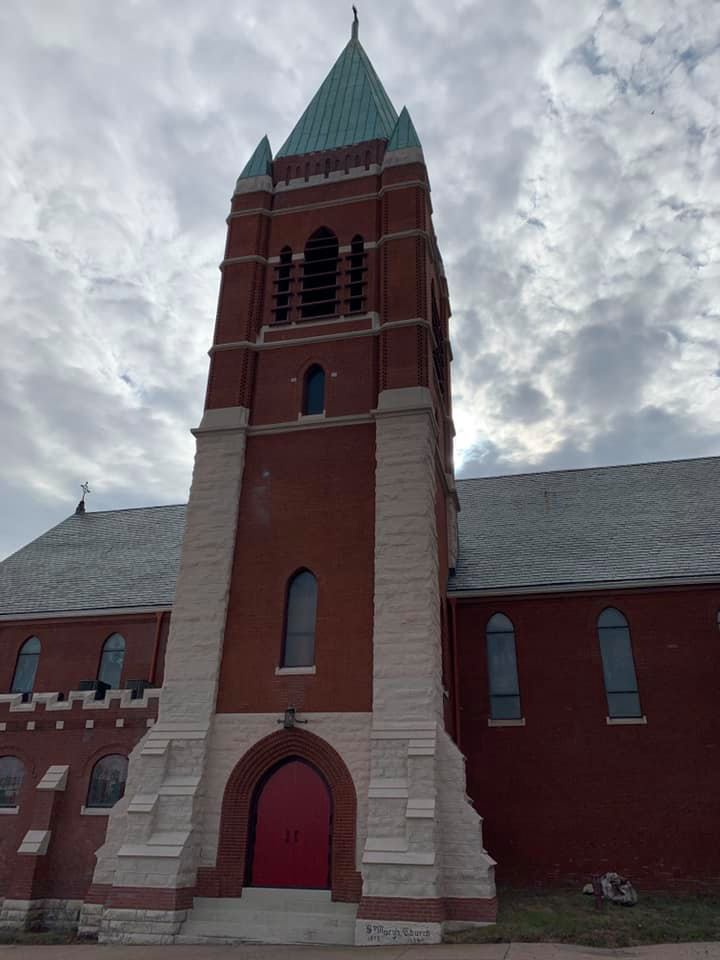
- West side of the church

Religion
- Affiliation: Episcopal Church in the United States of America
- Leadership: The Rev'd Sean C. Kim, SCP, Priest in Charge.

Location
- Location: Kansas City, Missouri, United States
- Interactive map of St. Mary's Episcopal Church

Architecture
- Architect: William Halsey Wood
- Type: Late Gothic Revival

Website
- www.stmaryskcmo.org

St. Mary's Episcopal Church, at 1307 Holmes Street in downtown Kansas City, Missouri, is an Episcopal church in the Anglo-Catholic tradition. It is part of the Episcopal Diocese of West Missouri. The church reported 121 members in 2015 and 195 members in 2023; no membership statistics were reported in 2024 parochial reports. Plate and pledge income reported for the congregation in 2024 was $183,899 with average Sunday attendance (ASA) of 77 persons.

St. Mary's was the first Episcopal church in Kansas City, established in 1857. The parish was founded as St. Luke's, and the name changed in the 1870s. It was sponsored by Trinity Episcopal Church in Independence, Missouri. Prior to the construction of the building at 13th and Holmes, the congregation worshiped at several locations including a building at 8th and Walnut.

The current Holmes Street building was built in 1887. The Gothic Revival church was accepted into the National Register of Historic Places in 1978.

== Gallery ==
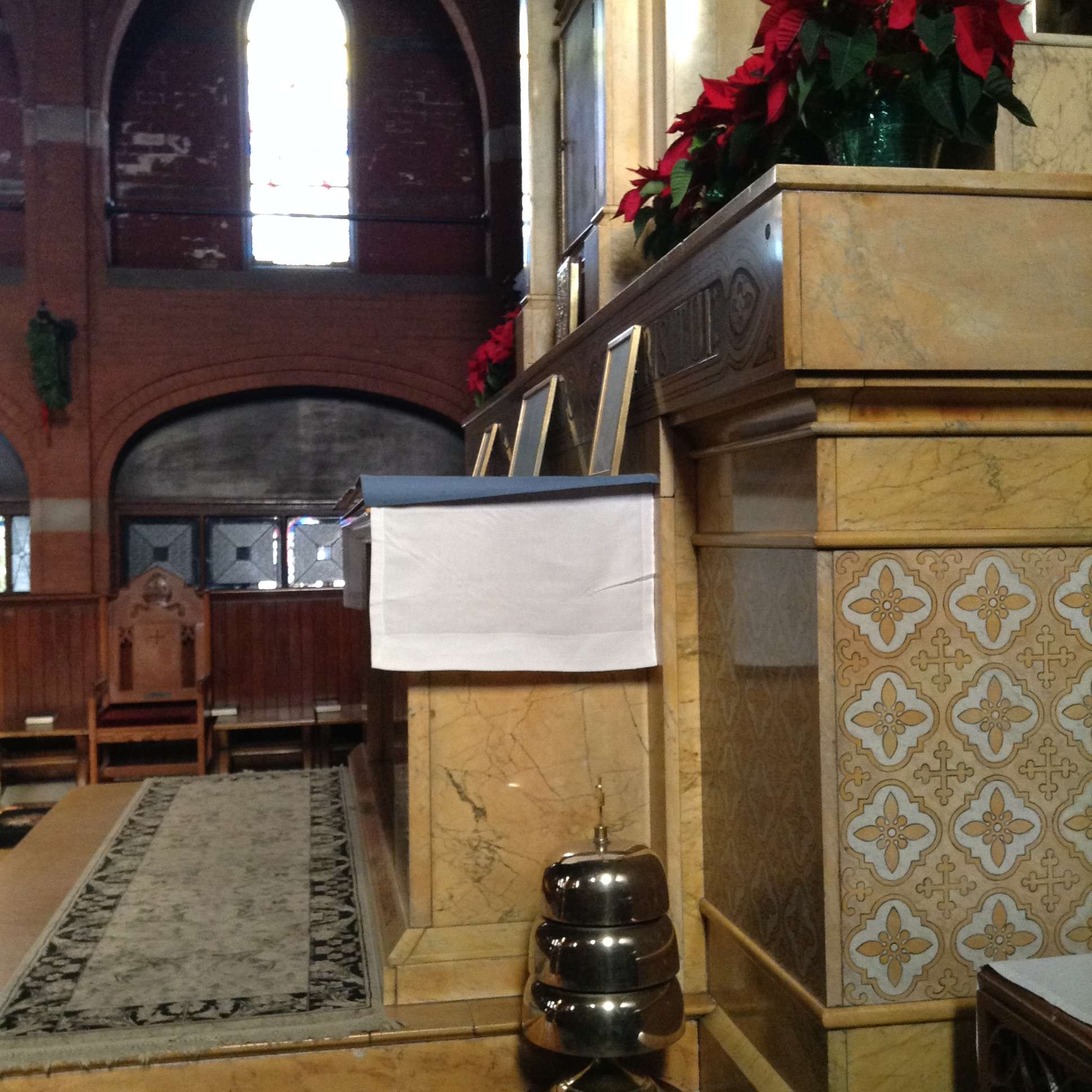
The high altar in the church's nave

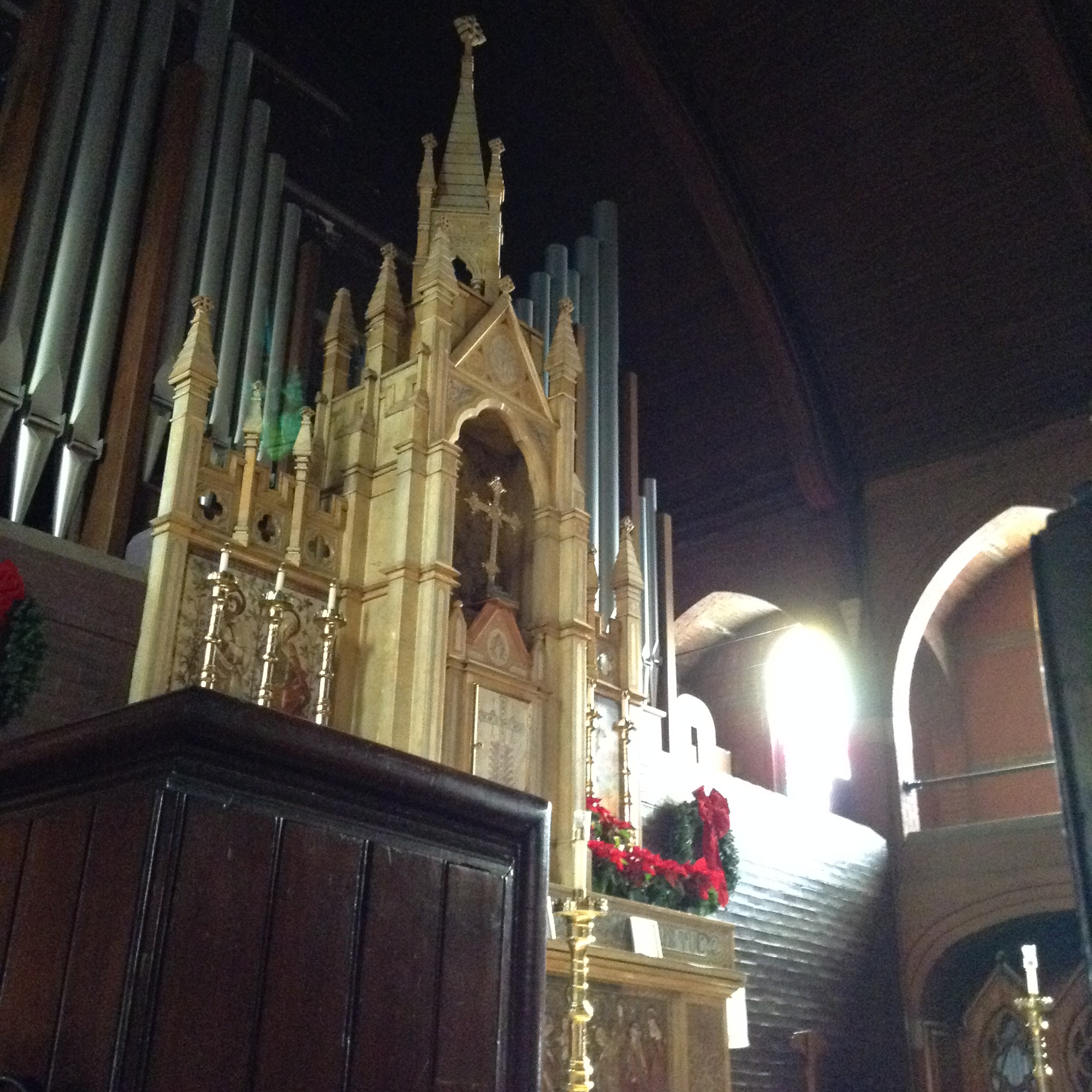
View of the altar from the choir stall

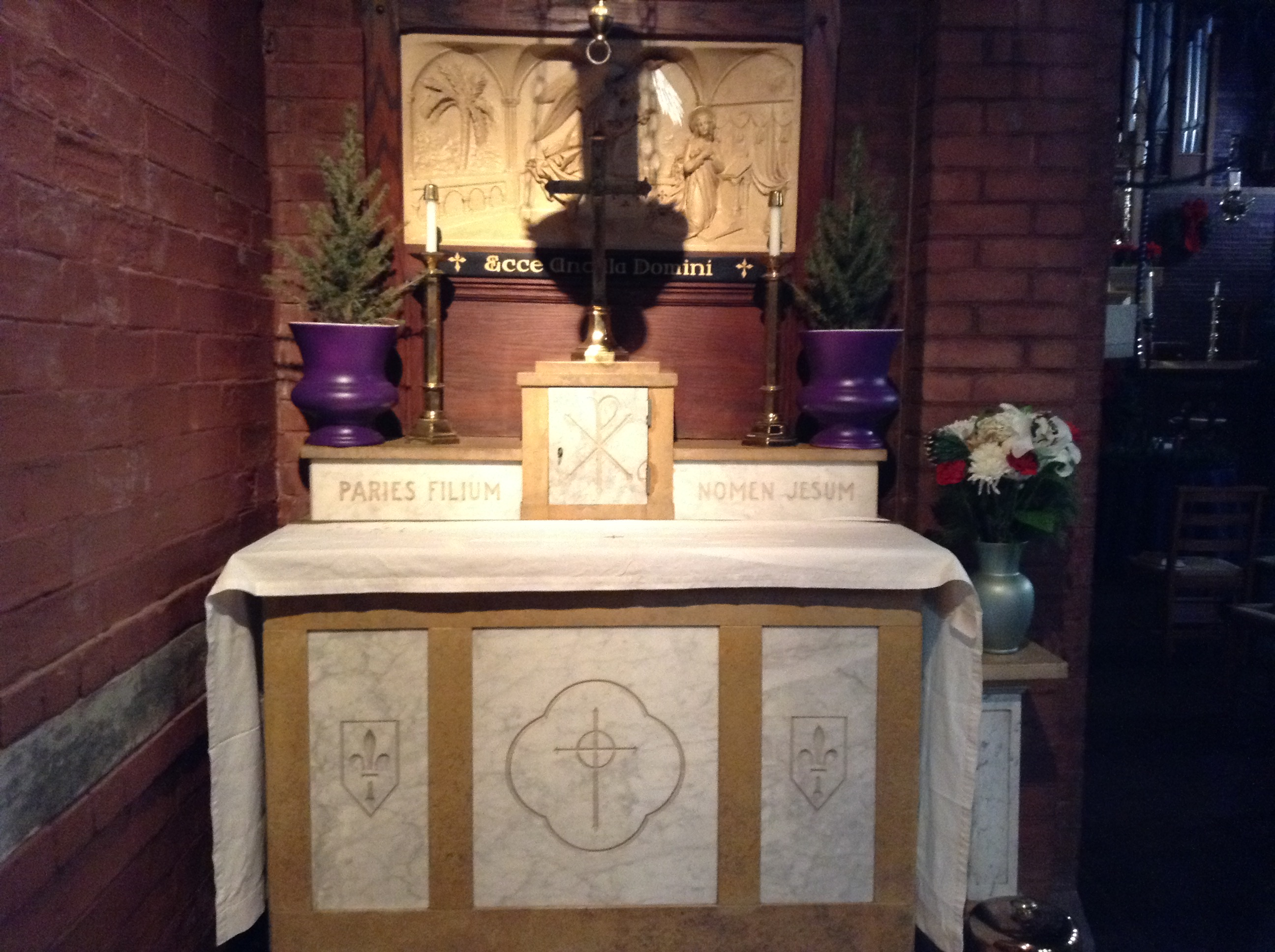
Chapel of the Annunciation

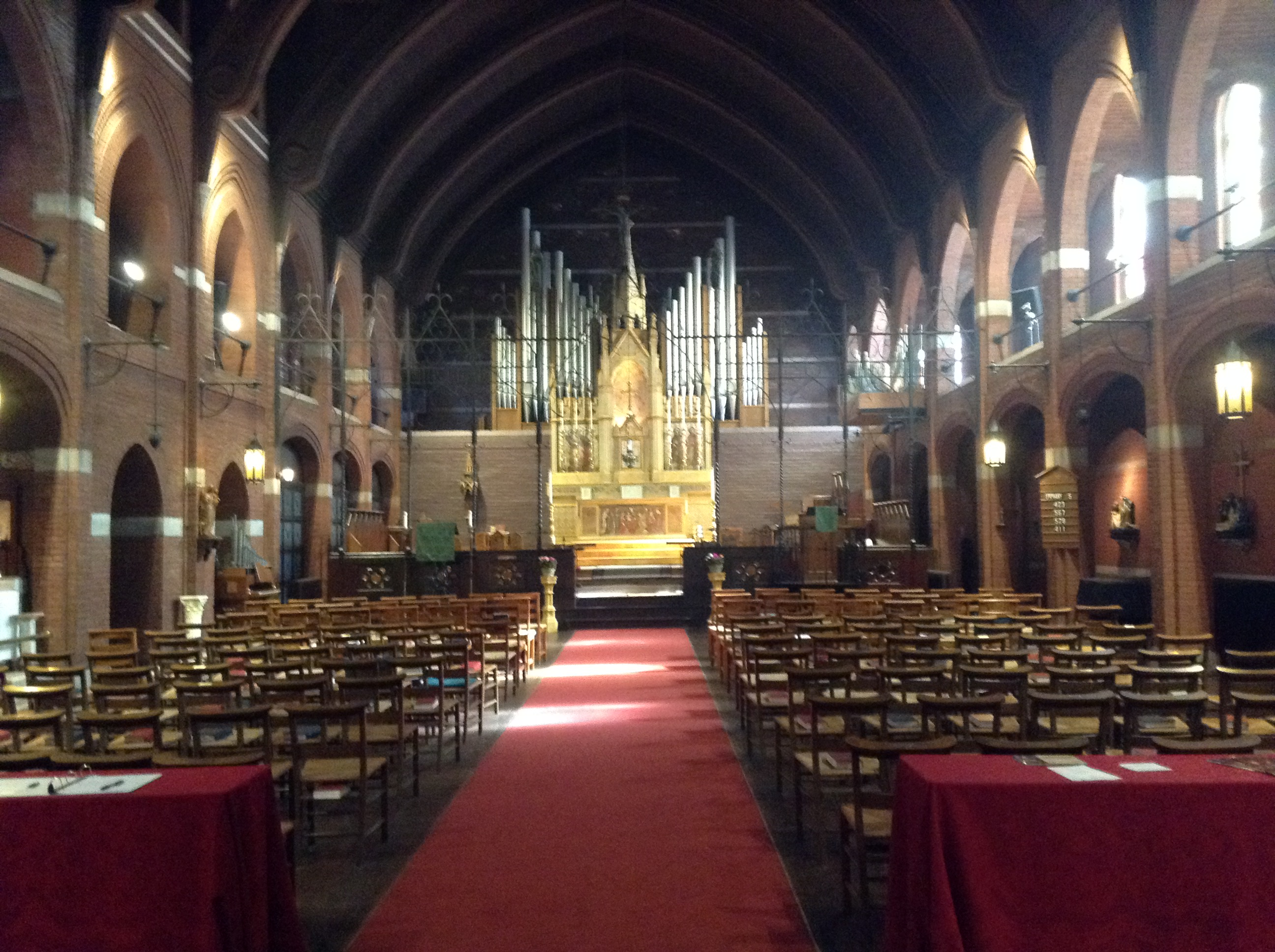
The nave of St. St. Mary's Episcopal Church

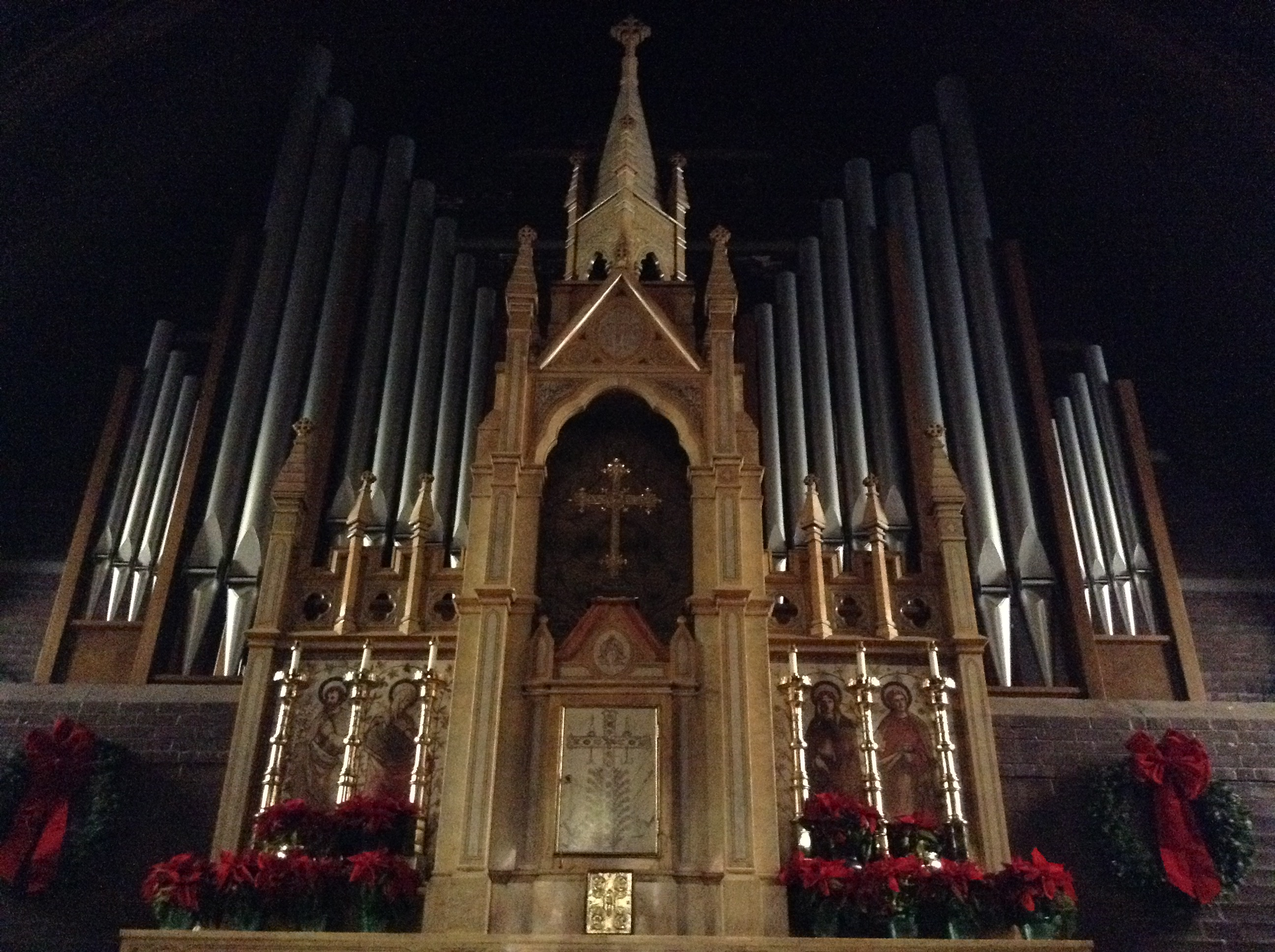
The reredos behind the altar
