= Harley Prayer Book =

The Harley Prayer Book
- British Library, Harley MS 7653
- Type: prayer book
- Date: c.775–c.825
- Place of origin: England, Midlands (Mercia, perhaps Worcester)
- Language: Latin
- Material: Parchment and ink
- Size: 225 × 150 (175 × 105) mm
- Script: Minuscule
- Additions: glosses in Old English
- Previously kept: Part of the Harleian Library
- Other: Member of the Southumbrian 'Tiberius Group'

The Harley Prayer Book (British Library, Harley MS 7653) is one of a group of four early Anglo-Saxon prayer books produced in Mercia, likely around Worcester. The others are the Royal Prayer Book, the Book of Cerne, and the Book of Nunnaminster.

Dating from the last quarter of the 8th or first quarter of the 9th century, the Harley Prayer Book includes an annotation symbol resembling a rune-like dotted ‘Y’ added around the time of the book’s creation. The same symbol appears in the Royal Prayer Book, pointing to likely shared provenance of these two manuscripts.

Written in Latin, with added glosses in Old English, the codex is fragmentary, consisting of only seven parchment leaves (plus seven modern paper flyleaves added at the start and another seven at the end). It contains eight prayers:

1. (ff. 1r–2v) an invocation with lorican features;
2. (ff. 2v–3v) a plea for God to keep the supplicant from sin;
3. (f. 4r–4v) an invocation to the Trinity, angels, apostles, John, Clement, Gregory, Benedict, Martin, Lawrence, Stephen, George, and all martyrs;
4. (ff. 4v–5v) a plea to follow the ways of God;
5. (ff. 5v–6v) a prayer in praise of the Trinity;
6. (ff. 6v–7r) a penitential plea to enter heaven;
7. (f. 7r–7v) an invocation addressed to the Trinity, Old Testament prophets, and All Saints, that the supplicant may enter heaven with them;
8. (f. 7v) an incomplete prayer.

All of the prayers are copied in an insular minuscule script, in ink, with small initials added in brown ink, and some letters highlighted or heightened by addition of red, green, or yellow, or some combination of the three.
