= Book of Cerne =

Anglo-Saxon prayer book

The Book of Cerne
- Cambridge, Cambridge University Library, MS Ll.1.10
- Book of Cerne, f. 12v: Gospel of St Mark miniature, showing the winged Lion of St Mark
- Type: Prayer book
- Date: c.820–840
- Place of origin: Mercia, Dorset, Cerne Abbey
- Language(s): Latin, with Old English
- Material: Parchment, ink
- Size: 285 × 225 (230 × 195) mm or (9.05 x 7.6) In
- Script: Insular minuscule
- Contents: Gospel extracts; prayers and hymns; Lorica of Laidcenn; Breviate Psalter; Harrowing of Hell
- Illumination(s): 4 full-page miniatures of the Evangelists in colours. Initials in gold, some zoomorphic; interlace initials
- Additions: Glosses in Old English
- Other: Member of the Southumbrian 'Tiberius Group'

The Book of Cerne (Cambridge, Cambridge University Library, MS Ll. 1. 10) is an early ninth-century Insular or Anglo-Saxon Latin personal prayer book with Old English components. It belongs to a group of four such early prayer books, the others being the Royal Prayerbook, the Harleian prayerbook, and the Book of Nunnaminster. It is now commonly believed to have been produced sometime between ca. 820 and 840 AD in the Southumbrian/Mercian region of England. The original book contains a collection of several different texts, including New Testament Gospel excerpts, a selection of prayers and hymns with a version of the Lorica of Laidcenn, an abbreviated or Breviate Psalter, and a text of the Harrowing of Hell liturgical drama, which were combined to provide a source used for private devotion and contemplation. Based on stylistic and palaeographical features, the Book of Cerne has been included within the Canterbury or Tiberius group of manuscripts that were manufactured in southern England in the 8th and 9th centuries AD associated with the Mercian hegemony in Anglo-Saxon England. This Anglo-Saxon manuscript is considered to be the most sophisticated and elaborate of this group. The Book of Cerne exhibits various Irish/Celtic, Anglo-Saxon, Continental, and Mediterranean influences in its texts, ornamentation, and embellishment.

Recent research of this manuscript by Michelle P. Brown suggests that the various Anglo-Saxon component sections of this book are conceptually inter-related and primarily associated with the doctrine of the Communion of Saints ("communio sanctorum"). This doctrine is found in the Ninth Article of the Apostles' Creed ("Symbolum Apostolorum") and is based on the spiritual union between each Christian, living and dead, and Christ, and between each other Christian, which ultimately derives its origins in the "vita apostolica" and the inter-relationships or fellowship of the Early Christian congregations. This doctrine is found in the Anglo-Saxon Creed dating to the 9th century. However, in addition to the doctrine of the Communion of Saints, other themes are embedded in the texts and images that include a penitential and Paschal element that emphasizes baptism and communion (Eucharist), as well as notions of forgiveness and salvation.

== Manuscript Organization and Contents ==
=== Contents and Organization ===
The original early medieval Anglo-Saxon "core" of this codex is composed of six different, but conceptually inter-related sections or texts. In collational sequence, these sections are:

==== An Old English Exhortation to Prayer on folio 2 recto (r) ====
Written in an Old English dialect, presumably Mercian, this text was to introduce the reader of this book to the main purpose of the following devotional texts. According to Brown the purpose of this exhortation was to emphasize the unity of the Communion of Saints in the form of the Roman Church on earth and in heaven. This introductory exhortation prayer is considered to be the earliest known extant example of Old English prose.

==== The New Testament Gospel Extracts on folios 2 verso (v) to 40r ====
This section is composed of extracts of the Passion and Resurrection narratives from the four Gospels of Matthew, Mark, Luke, and John. Kuypers noted that these extracts were from a Vulgate text with some anomalies or peculiarities. They do have some affinities to Celtic Gospel books, but with corrections. A full-page polychrome evangelist miniature with Latin inscriptions precedes each Gospel text (see below).

==== An Acrostic Poem on folio 21r ====
This consists of a poem written in Latin with each line written in different alternating colored inks of red, purple, blue, and orange. This poem names Ædeluald Bishop ("Aedeluald episcopus"). It seems that this poem was placed to fill in a blank page caused by a scribal miscalculation.

==== A series of Prayers and Hymns on folios 43r to 87v ====
These seventy-one prayers and hymns, including the Lorica of Laidcenn (folios 43r-44v) were written in Latin, with Old English glosses. Thirteen prayers (Numbers 7, 10, 16, 26, 31–32, 63, 67–68, 70, and 72–74) exhibit Irish influences, seven prayers (Numbers 18–19, 53–54, 61–62, and 66) contain apocryphal content, and Marian devotion is found in six (Numbers 1, 15, 18, and 56–58) prayers.

==== A Breviate Psalter on folios 87v to 98r ====
This section is composed of a selection of abbreviated Old Testament Psalm verses that are so ordered as to form a continuous prayer. The Book of Cerne only contains 272 verses, not the full 365 verses that are commonly found in these early Psalters. Psalms 118 to 136 are missing from this book, which may be due to errors in the exemplar from which it was copied, or these missing verses may not have suited the scribe's or patron's intentions. This form of abridged Psalm verses may suggest Irish influences, however, the Psalm texts used are from the Old Latin Romanum Psalter version, which supports the inference for an Anglo-Saxon composition. This section is introduced by a rubric in Latin "hoc argumentum forsorum [sic. versorum] oeðelpald episcopus decrepsit" ("Bishop Ædeluald has worn out these lines of proof").

==== The Harrowing of Hell text on folios 98v to 99v ====
The text of this liturgical drama is in a form of an apocryphal dialogue between the narrator, Adam, and Eve, with a choir/chorus that is indicated in the text by alternating black and red inks. This extra New Testament story tells of when Jesus went into Hell between the Crucifixion of Jesus and his resurrection for the salvation of all the righteous who had died since the beginning of the world. However, the existing text may be incomplete with its ending now lost. According to Dumville this liturgical drama seems to be one of the earliest known examples of this text, influenced by the text of the Descensus ad Infernos found in the Latin version of the extra New Testament Gospel of Nicodemus, as well as a now lost Latin pseudo-Augustinian homily that has survived in an Old English version found in the Blickling Homilies (Princeton, Princeton University Library, W.H. Schelde Collection, Blickling Homilies), and the Roman Psalter. There is a conceptual or compositional relationship between this section and the preceding Breviate Psalter verses, as this Harrowing of Hell is a pastiche of verses from the Psalms. An Irish influence is suggested by the metrical structure of the hymns as well as the inclusion of the Breviate Psalter.

=== Later Accretions ===
This early medieval core is sandwiched between two later sets of accretions dating from the 14th to the early 16th century AD that relate to the Benedictine Cerne Abbey in Dorset, and have provided this codex with its current name. The top set of accretions preceding the core is composed of 26 leaves containing between forty and fifty charters pertaining to the Abbey at Cerne Abbas and a prayer attributed to St. Augustine that date to the 14th century. The bottom set of accretions following the core is composed of 28 leaves that include a text of the De Beata Maria and an inventory of the relics contained within the abbey dating between the 14th century and the early 16th century (pre-Dissolution).

== Script ==
The basic script in the Book of Cerne uses a Southumbrian/Mercian pointed minuscule that is consistent with Phase II Minuscule type identified by T.J. Brown. Throughout the original ninth century Anglo-Saxon texts there is little variation seen in the relatively high quality script, conforming to a "cursive media" grade script or basic cursive minuscule lettering. Although minuscule letters are found throughout the majority of the text, there are variant examples that were used on higher grade letters, such as capitals, uncials, and half-uncials, that are occasionally embedded within the text to emphasize certain points, such as indicating punctuation marks to emphasize pauses. Based on the palaeographical evidence in this codex, it is inferred that only a single scribe was involved in the writing of the original Anglo-Saxon text.

== Illumination and Decoration ==
This manuscript was decorated and embellished with four painted full-page miniatures, major and minor letters, continuing panels, and litterae notibiliores. The ornamental elements include zoomorphic/animal, floral, interlace, and curvilinear motifs and designs. The color palette employed by the artist/illuminator consisted of pigments of gold, purple, blues, red, red/brown, yellow, green, white, and black. The pigment binding medium was clarified egg white or clarea.

=== The Evangelist Miniatures ===
In the Book of Cerne the illuminations of the four evangelists precede each Gospel section containing the selected extracts from Matthew, Mark, Luke, and John. These miniatures are found on the verso (v) sides of folios 2 (Matthew), 12 (Mark), 21 (Luke), and 31 (John). All four illuminations are consistent using the same format, but with nuanced variations that help to visually discern and introduce each Gospel section. The miniatures exhibit a more linear figural style. In the top center set within a circular medallion or roundel is a partial frontal human bust of the Evangelist who is beardless and has a halo or nimbus. He holds his Gospel book in his left hand, while the right hand is variable in each image. This medallion is located at the apex of an arched frame that is supported by two verticals or columns with capitals. These rest on or without a base on a bottom horizontal floor. Each set of capitals in these illuminations is different from each other. Set within the arch is a full-length figure is the particular tetramorph beast symbol of each particular Evangelist – Human/Angel (Matthew), Lion (Mark), Ox/Calf (Luke), and Eagle (John) – inspired by the vision found in the Old Testament Book of Ezekiel 1.10. All four evangelical beast symbols are all winged and haloed or nimbed, and each beast symbol holds a book in its fore or hind limbs. Each miniature is also accompanied by a set of two Latin inscriptions written in capital letters, one at the top flanking the human bust and the other at the bottom flanking the beast symbol.

==== The Gospel of Matthew Miniature on folio 2v ====
Within the top roundel of this miniature the Evangelist is shown with his right hand in a gesture of benediction with his two index fingers pointing to his Gospel book that he holds in his left hand. His tetramorph beast symbol within the arch consists of a full-figure frontal standing angel. The capitals or column heads from which the arches spring consist of simple double rings or cusps, and the columns rest on two stepped bases. This miniature is artistically more elaborate than the other three illuminations, thus emphasizing its important status as the first Gospel book. This elaboration includes the additional architectural elements (bases) as well as the inclusion of Celtic/Irish Ultimate La Tène trumpet-spiral and pelta infill designs or motifs in the spandrels. The Latin inscriptions for this miniature read: top "+ HIC MATHEVS IN HUMANITATE” (“Here Matthew is in his human form”), and bottom “+ HIC MATHEVS IN ANGELICA ASSPECTV VIDETVR” (“Here Matthew is seen in his angelic aspect”).

==== The Gospel of Mark Miniature on Folio 12v ====
Within the top roundel of this miniature the Evangelist is depicted with his right hand in a gesture of benediction with his two index fingers pointing to his Gospel book which he holds in his left hand. Below, his beast symbol within the arch consists of a full-figure, three-quarter profile figure of a winged lion that stands on its hind legs. The capitals from which the arches spring consist of single tablet capitals topped by floral buds. In addition to the arches is a pointed floral leaf-shaped bud with two shoots that also spring from these two capitals. The flanking two columns rest on the floor or ground, lacking bases. The Latin inscriptions for this miniature read: top "+ HIC MARCVS IN HUMANITATE" ("Here Mark is in his human form"), and bottom "+ HIC MARCVS IMAGINEM TENET LEONIS" ("Here Mark has the image of a lion").

==== The Gospel of Luke Miniature on folio 21v ====
Within the top roundel the Evangelist is shown holding a stylus in his right hand and an open Gospel book he holds in his left hand. His beast symbol within the arch consists of a full-figure, three-quarter profile figure of a winged horned calf/ox standing on its hind hooves. The hindquarters of this beast symbol appear to have been borrowed or copied from elsewhere, and the upper half of the calf was influenced by either a Carolingian or Mediterranean exemplar or model, thereby creating a hybrid image. The capitals from which the arches spring consist of simple double tablet capitals painted in reddish brown and blue. Here again, the flanking columns rest directly on the floor or ground lacking bases. The Latin inscriptions for this miniature read: top = “+ HIC LUCAS IN HUMANITATE” (“Here Luke is in his human form”), and bottom “+ HIC LVCAS FORMAM ACCEPIT VITULI” (“Here Luke has taken the shape of a calf”).

==== The Gospel of John Miniature on folio 31v ====
Within the top roundel the Evangelist is depicted with both his hands holding his closed Gospel book. His beast symbol within the arch consists of a full-figure frontal eagle figure with its head turned to its right in profile in an "imperial" fashion. The capitals consist of distinctive elaborate masks from which spring the arch as well as foliate and zoomorphic motifs. The Latin inscriptions for this miniature read: top “+ HIC IOHANNIS IN HUMANITATE” (“Here John is in his human form”), and bottom “+ HIC IOHANNIS VERTIT FRONTEM IN AQVILAM” (“Here John has transformed into the likeness of an eagle”).

==== Marginalia ====
On the outer margins outside the arched frames of the Evangelist illuminations for Matthew, Luke, and John are partial line drawings or “doodles” in black ink of the tetramorph beast symbols for these three Evangelists.

=== Decorative Letters and Motifs ===
Other decorative features are found throughout the textual components of this codex, and include the major and minor initials, continuing lettering, and litterae notabiliores. The types of decoration used consist of principally of both zoomorphic/animal and floral motifs. The zoomorphic decoration in the Book of Cerne is characteristically composed of “brontosaurus-like” beasts and grotesques that indicate Hiberno-Saxon, primarily Irish, origins with influences from the Mediterranean (Coptic and Byzantine). Foliate decorative motifs are primarily found on exteriors and terminals of zoomorphic/animal elements, the frames of the continuation panels and, as described above, the architectural capitals on the arched frames of the Mark and John Evangelist illuminations.

==== Major Initials and Continuation Panels ====
These are found at the opening of each of the four Gospel extract texts as well as the Suffragare panel that introduces Lorica of Laidcenn text on folio 43 recto. Continuation panels are the decorative backgrounds or frames to the letters following the major initials. These elements exhibit the use of display capitals, zoomorphic, sub-zoomorphic, interlaced, and curvilinear decoration. The initials and continuation panels for the Gospel extract texts are distinguished by the use of gold and purple pigments, while the one in the Lorica text use the colors red, green, yellow, and blue.

==== Minor Initials ====
The minor initials within the text are decorated with interlace and curvilinear motifs with zoomorphic terminals.

==== Litterae Notabiliores ====
Almost all of these letters are ornamented with abstract zoomorphic/animal motifs, with the exception of one anthropomorphic image found on folio 91 verso.

== Attribution and provenance ==
Like a number of other manuscripts that comprise the Canterbury/Tiberius group, the specific provenance or place (i.e., scriptorium) of manufacture of the Book of Cerne is unknown. This issue of provenance has generated much academic debate within the literature of this Southumbian codex, especially with the two references to Bishop Ædeluald/Oeðelpald, presumably the patron of this codex, within its text. The issue partly revolves around the identity of Bishop Ædeluald/Oeðelpald mentioned in the texts. Some researchers believe that these texts refer to Bishop Ædiluald/Æthelwold (721-740 AD) of Lindisfarne in Northumbria, while others have suggested that the name refers to Bishop Ædeluald (818-830 AD) of Lichfield in Mercia. As early as 1868 J.O. Westwood attributed the Book of Cerne to Lindisfarne in the Anglo-Saxon kingdom of Northumbria. Variants of this Lindisfarne recension theory have been supported by subsequent studies written by such scholars as Bishop, Henry, and Dumville. However, other researchers who favor a 9th-century Mercian original have contested this Lindisfarne hypothesis. In 1902 Kuypers recognized this issue in his study of this manuscript where he cautiously identified the patron as the Bishop of Lichfield. More recent studies of the Book of Cerne by Moorish, Wormald, Robinson, Brown, Walker, and Webster have supported the Southumbrian/Mercian hypothesis. Brown has inferred that even if this manuscript is linked to the earlier Bishop of Lindisfarne, the orthography of the acrostic poem suggests that it may have been produced with reference to Bishop Ædeluald of Lichfield, or it was changed with him in mind.

The other interpretive issue concerning the Book of Cerne pertains to attempts to identify a plausible scriptorium location or origin provenance in which this codex was produced. Generally, its Southumbian or Mercian origins are now commonly accepted based on palaeographic, codicological, and stylistic evidence, particularly the script type used and visual decorative elements of the miniatures and text. This manuscript has often been placed within a group of Anglo-Saxon manuscripts alternatively referred to as the Canterbury or Tiberius Group, which is composed of several other well-known examples, such as the Vespasian Psalter (London, British Library, Cotton Vespasian A.i.), the Codex Aureus (Stockholm, Royal Library, MS A.135), the Barberini Gospels (Rome, Vatican, Biblioteca Apostolica Vaticana, MS lat.570), and the Royal Bible (London, British Library, Royal MS I.E.vi), to name a few. This group of manuscripts is distinguished by several characteristic elements that include:

- The use of minuscule script in later manuscripts in this group, as evident in the Book of Cerne;
- The use of an interlace display script in which each letter is joined to one another by means of brontosaurus-like beast heads; and
- The display of script with zoomorphic ornament that resembles contemporary 9th Trewhiddle style metalwork, which is characterized with the use of interlaced and contorted animals and leafy scrollwork.

T. D. Kendrick observed that the Book of Cerne exhibits a distinctive style from the other manuscripts from the Canterbury group and suggested that it was possibly Mercian in origin. Later, in several articles dating between 1948 and 1957 there was a debate between S.M. Kuhn and K. Sisam over the provenance of these manuscripts, including the Book of Cerne. Although the Book of Cerne has been periodically attributed with a possible Mercian origin, Kuhn postulated the direct link between this manuscript and the Bishop of Lichfield, and attributed the entire group of manuscripts to Mercia, particularly Lichfield. Sisam, on the other hand, dismissed Kuhn's interpretation by reasserting the Canterbury/Kentish association for this group of Anglo-Saxon manuscripts. However, Sisam did realize that the Book of Cerne was different from the other manuscripts of this group, and he postulated that it could be a provincial or Mercian outlier. The recent in depth studies of the Book of Cerne by Brown has included this codex within the Canterbury/Tiberius group of manuscripts that she argues were produced in Mercia, Kent, and Wessex in the 8th and 9th centuries CE, a region which she defines as a “Mercian Schriftprovinz”. Along with other manuscripts including the Barberini Gospels, Brown has placed the Book of Cerne in the Mercian school of the Tiberius group. She further concluded that this codex was the product of a scriptorium in Worcester, or perhaps Lichfield.

== Subsequent History ==
The subsequent history of this 9th-century AD Insular/Anglo-Saxon manuscript after its production is equally speculative. However, the existing evidence seems to suggest that at some point after its production in the later 9th and early 10th centuries this codex may have been subsequently relocated somewhere in unoccupied Mercia, presumably Worcester, or even Wessex. This evacuation, along with other ecclesiastical manuscripts, was to provide a safe environment or repository to protect the book from potential Viking raids and incursions.

Despite the attachment of accretionary texts to the original Insular/Anglo-Saxon book relating to the Benedictine Abbey at Cerne in Dorset, there are even questions concerning whether or not this codex was ever physically housed at this monastery. All one can say for certain based on codicological evidence is that at some point after the Dissolution of the Monasteries in the 16th century, and by 1697, that these accretionary documents from Cerne Abbas were attached to the original Insular/Anglo-Saxon core.

The earliest historical account of the Book of Cerne is found in an inventory of the personal library of John Moore, Bishop of Norwich (1691–1707) and Bishop of Ely (1707–1714) found in Edward Bernard’s Catalogi Librorum Manuscriptorum dating to 1697. After Moore’s death in 1714 his library, along with the Book of Cerne, was purchased by King George I (reigned 1714-1727) for 6,000 guineas. The king then presented this library to Cambridge University as a royal gift on 20 September 1715.
