= Wigbod =

8th-century theological writer

Wigbod (Latin: Wigbodus, also known as Wigbald or Wigbold) was a theological writer of the eighth century.

Of his works there is extant a Latin commentary on the Octateuch called Quaestiones in Octateuchum that is, on the Five Books of Moses (the Pentateuch), and the books of Josue (Joshua), Judges and Ruth, making eight books in all. He wrote the work, as the full title states, at the command of Charlemagne. As Charlemagne is only called "king of the Franks and Lombards" in the work, not Emperor, it must have been written before the year 800.

The form of the book is that of a dialogue between pupil and teacher. The pupil propounds the difficulties and the teacher gives the solution. Wigbold, however, did not compose these answers himself, but gives verbatim, statements by eight Church Fathers: St. Augustine, St. Gregory, St. Jerome, St. Ambrose, St.Hilary of Poitiers, St. Isidore of Seville, St. Eucherius and St. Junilius. For the greater part of Genesis only Jerome and Isidore are drawn on, and later Isidore almost entirely. The two members of the Congregation of Saint-Maur, Martène and Durand, who found the manuscript in the monastery of St. Maximin of Trier, have, therefore, only given the portion to the first three chapters of Genesis in their Collectio amplissima, IX, (Paris, 1733), 295–366. This portion has been reprinted in P. L., XCVI. 1101–68.

The work is chiefly valuable for its preservation of the texts of the Fathers quoted. The commentary is preceded by three Latin poems in hexameter. In the first Wigbold felicitates his book, because it is to be taken into the palace of the king; in the second he praises the king, particularly because Charlemagne has brought together books from many places, and because he knows the Bible well; in the third he treats the seven days of creation. The first two are largely taken from the introductory poems written by Eugenius II of Toledo to the work of Dracontius, the third is the closing poem to Dracontius (Monum. German. Histor.: Poet. Latin., I, 95–97). The manuscript used by Martène and Durand is now unknown. Two manuscripts without the poems are at Admont and Vienna.

Nothing certain is known as to the author. Martène and Durand mention Wigbald, who was vice-chancellor under the chancellors Itherius and Rado, and Widbod, who was Count of Périgueux about 778. The last mentioned hardly seems possible.
