= Royal Prayer Book =

The Royal Prayer Book
- British Library, Royal MS 2 A XX
- Type: Prayer book
- Date: c.800–c.825
- Place of origin: England, S. (Mercia)
- Language: Latin
- Material: Parchment, ink, paint
- Size: 230 × 170 (180 × 130) mm
- Script: Insular minuscule
- Contents: Prayers; the apocryphal letter of Christ to Abgar; Gospel readings
- Illumination(s): 2 zoomorphic initials in gold, silver, colours. Smaller initials with colours and red dots. Marginal drawings.
- Additions: Interlinear glosses and marginal notes in Old English
- Other: Member of the Southumbrian 'Tiberius Group'

The Royal Prayer Book (London, British Library Royal MS 2.A.XX) is a collection of prayers believed to have been copied in the late eighth century or the early ninth century. It was written in West Mercia, likely either in or around Worcester.

== Characteristics ==
It is one of four early Anglo-Saxon prayerbooks—the others being the Book of Cerne, the Harley Prayer Book, and the Book of Nunnaminster—all of which have some textual interrelationships. The prayers are mainly in Latin but have some Old English and Greek elements. Its general theme "would appear to be Christ as the healer of mankind", and its concern with physical healing is sufficient to suggest that it "might have functioned as a devotional, and practical, tool for a physician".

Folio 45v contains what seems to be the first manuscript attestation in any Germanic language of the common noun elf.

The manuscript also contains detailed Old English glosses from the tenth century in the Mercian dialect of Old English.

== Facsimiles ==
- Digital facsimile (British Library)
