= Southumbrians =

Anglo-Saxons occupying Northern Mercia

The Southumbrians (Old English: Sūþ(an)hymbre) were the Anglo-Saxon people occupying northern Mercia. The term might not have been used by the Mercians and was instead possibly coined by the Deiran or Bernician people as a territorial response to their own Kingdom of Northumbria. The Anglo-Saxon Chronicle refers to King Coenred as having become the King of the Southumbrians in 702, two years before he became King of all the Mercians. The fact that Coenred was the son of Wulfhere, the Mercian King, implies that Southumbria was a sub-kingdom of Mercia.

More generally, Southumbria is used by modern historians to refer conveniently to all of Anglo-Saxon England south of the Humber estuary not in Northumbria, especially in the period before England was unified.
