= Saint Petersburg Gospels =

The Saint Petersburg Gospels or Leningrad Gospels (housed in Saint Petersburg at the National Library of Russia Cod. F. v. I. 8) is an illuminated manuscript of the gospels in Hiberno-Saxon style dating from around 800 AD.

This highly idiosyncratic work may have been produced in England south of the Humber. It is not to be confused with the Leningrad Codex of the Hebrew Bible.
