= Barberini Gospels =

Illuminated manuscript

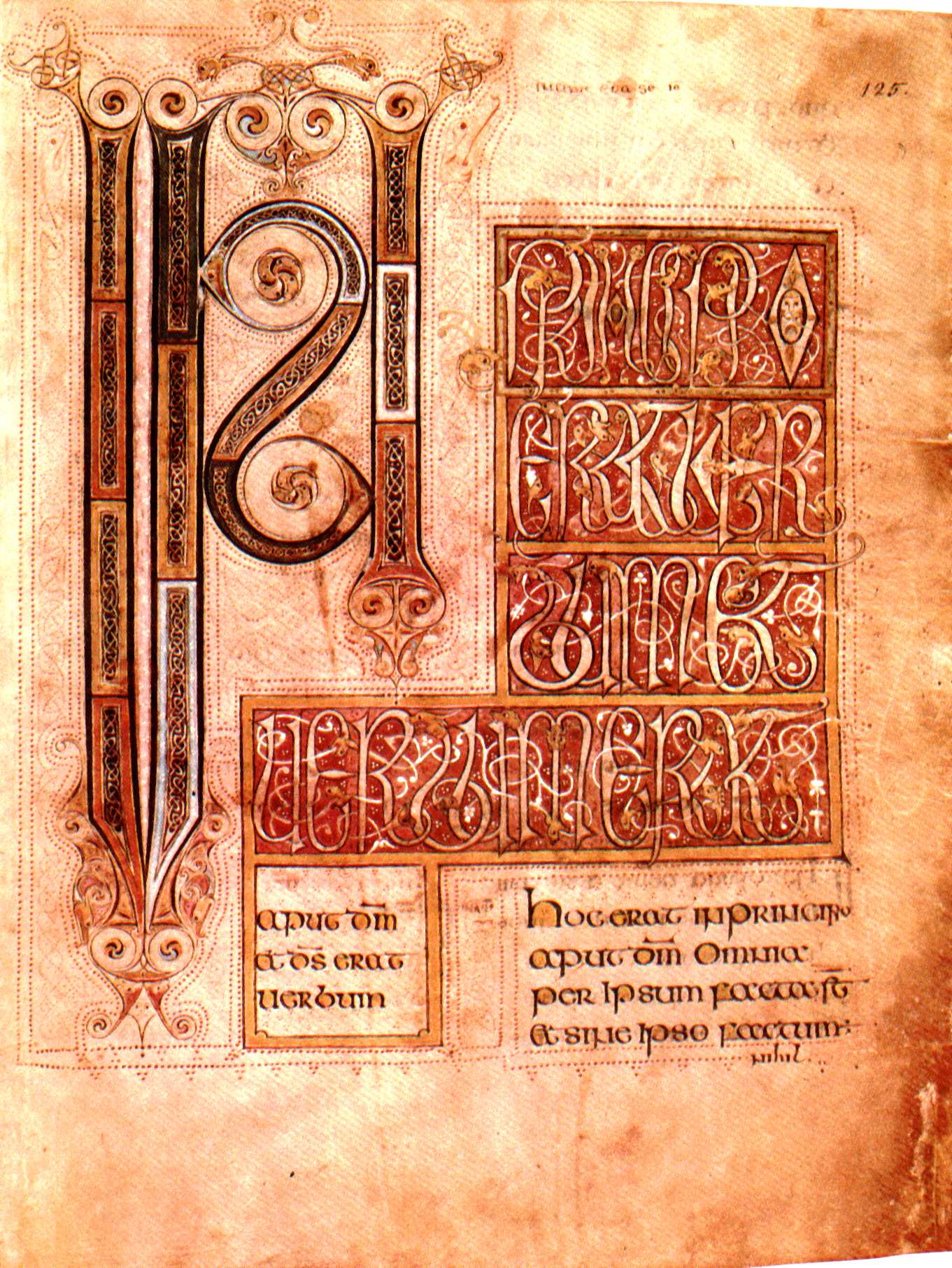
Folio 125r from the Barberini Gospels: The incipit to John.

The Barberini Gospels is an illuminated Hiberno-Saxon manuscript Gospel Book (Rome, Vatican City, Biblioteca Apostolica, Barberini Lat. 570, also known as the Wigbald Gospels), assumed to be of a late 8th-century origin.

== History ==
After coming to light following its move to the Vatican Library in 1902 this luxury Gospel book had been largely ignored by the academic community until it became the subject of a doctoral dissertation in 2004. Earlier writing includes some brief comparisons of its iconography with that of its contemporaries and an inconclusive debate regarding the site of its production. There have also been speculations about a colophon, an entreaty for the reader to pray for one Wigbald and its role in providing a connection to a specific historical context. It is not known whether this is the same person as Wigbold, author of the Quaestiones in Octateuchum.

== Illumination ==
The Barberini Gospels contains one illuminated canon table, four Evangelist portraits, and fifteen decorated initials. The book follows a fairly standard format in which each separate Gospel book opens with an evangelist portrait of the author and a large decorated initial, or incipit, at the beginning of the text. Another large decorated initial, often referred to as the “monogram of Christ,” punctuates the beginning of Matthew's account of the Incarnation; more initials are inserted in a similar fashion at key points in the other Gospel texts.

Key to the treatment of the origin of the Barberini Gospels is the striking contrast between two very distinct traditions and painting styles. On the one hand are the elaborate and intricately decorated initials one comes to expect in insular manuscripts of this period. The technical expertise of these embellishments is at the same level as those of better-known manuscripts such as the Book of Kells or the Lichfield Gospels. On the other hand, there are many elements employed in the decoration of this Gospel book which do not seem to belong here, either because they more closely resemble motifs found in non-insular or Continental art or because they are too early, foreshadowing trends of a later, even Romanesque period.

== See also ==
- Barberini
