= Book of Nunnaminster =

9th-century Anglo-Saxon prayerbook

The Book of Nunnaminster
- British Library, Harley MS 2965
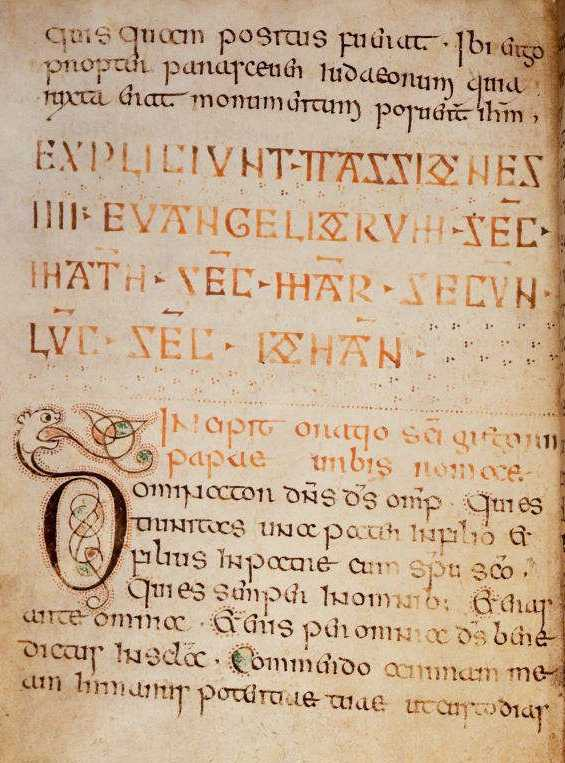
- Zoomorphic initial ‘d’: Book of Nunnaminster, f. 16v
- Type: Prayer book
- Date: c.800–c.825
- Place of origin: England, S. (Mercia, diocese of Worcester?)
- Language(s): Latin, with Old English
- Material: Parchment, ink
- Size: 215 × 160 (175 × 140) mm
- Condition: First quire missing
- Script: Insular minuscule
- Contents: Gospel extracts; prayers
- Illumination(s): 3 large initials with penwork, some zoomorphic. Smaller initials with coloured washes and red dots.
- Other: Member of the Southumbrian 'Tiberius Group'

The Book of Nunnaminster (London, British Library, Harley MS 2965) is a 9th-century Anglo-Saxon prayerbook. It was written in the kingdom of Mercia, using an "insular" hand (as used in the British Isles), related to Carolingian minuscule. It was probably later owned by Ealhswith, wife of Alfred the Great. It is related to, but of an earlier date than, the Book of Cerne, and also to the Royal Prayerbook and the Harleian prayerbook. Like Cerne it contains the Passion narratives of the four Gospels and a collection of non-liturgical prayers, many of which relate to the Passion. The Book of Nunnaminster shares some poems with the Book of Cerne. It also includes some decorated initials.

The 'Nunnaminster' was another name for St Mary's Abbey, Winchester, which is known to have employed female scribes. Some scholars have suggested that the Book of Nunnaminster may have been written by one of these female scribes because of its continual use of female pronouns in many of the prayers.
