= Bobbio (disambiguation) =

Bobbio may refer to

- Bobbio, a town and commune in the Province of Piacenza, Emilia Romagna, Italy
- Bobbio Pellice, a village and commune in the Province of Turin, Piedmont, Italy
- Bobbio Abbey, of the town in Emilia Romagna
- The anonymous Bobbio Scholiast who worked in the abbey during the seventh century
- The Bobbio Orosius, a seventh-century manuscript of the Chronicon of Paulus Orosius, thought to have been produced at the abbey.
- The Bobbio Jerome, a seventh-century manuscript copy of the Commentary on Isaiah attributed to St. Jerome
- The Diocese of Bobbio, erected in 1014
- Norberto Bobbio (1909–2004), an Italian philosopher, historian and journalist
