= Codex Usserianus =

Codex Usserianus may refer to:

- Codex Usserianus Primus
- Codex Usserianus Secundus, better known as the Garland of Howth
- Book of Durrow
