= Book of Mulling =

8th century Irish manuscript

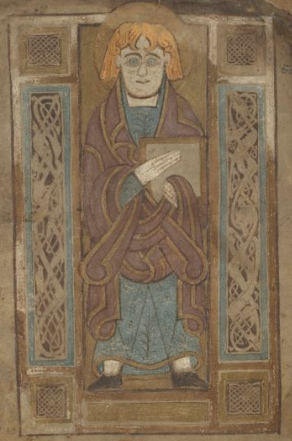
Folio 81v of the Book of Mulling contains a portrait of John the Evangelist.

The Book of Mulling or less commonly, Book of Moling (Dublin, Trinity College Library MS 60 (A. I. 15)), is an Irish pocket Gospel Book from the late 8th or early 9th century. The text collection includes the four Gospels, a liturgical service which includes the "Apostles' Creed", and in the colophon, a supposed plan of St. Moling's monastery enclosed by two concentric circles.

The name derives from a former notion that the scribe was the Leinster saint St. Moling (d. 697), founder of Tech-Moling (St. Mullins, Co. Carlow), whose subscription occurs in the colophon at the end of St John's Gospel: [N]omen scriptoris Mulling dicitur. However, the manuscript is younger and the script reveals that three scribes were involved: one for the prefaces, another for the synoptic gospels (Matthew, Mark and Luke) and a third for St John's Gospel. It remains possible that the manuscript was copied from an autograph manuscript of St Moling.

The script is written in Irish minuscule. This is in fact one of the latest surviving documents to use the high style in illuminated manuscripts. The decoration includes illuminated initials and three surviving Evangelist portraits: those of Matthew, Mark and John. Its jewelled shrine or cumdach is also preserved at Trinity College. The pocket gospel book is a distinctively Insular format, of which the Book of Mulling is a leading example.

== The Portrait of John ==
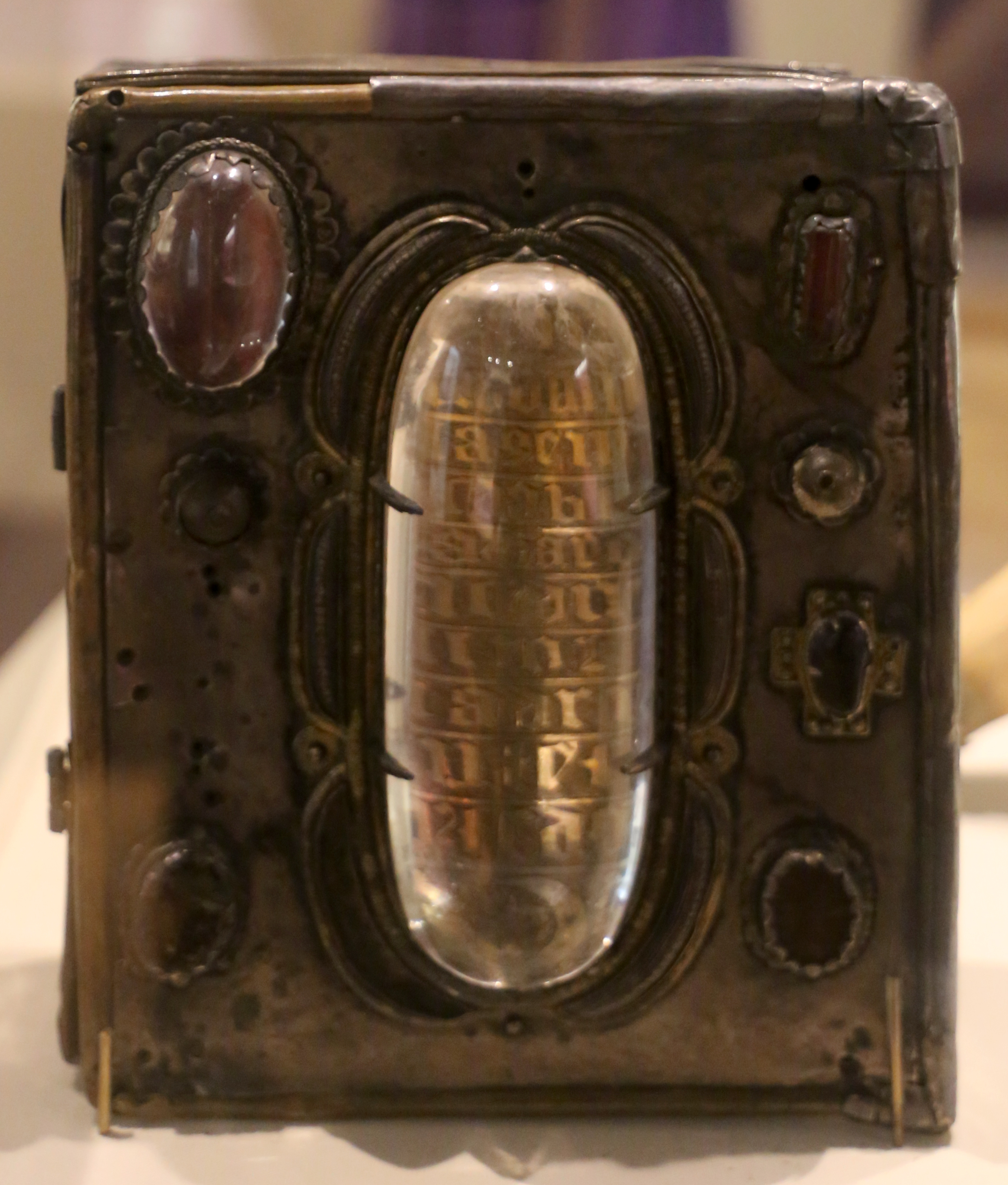
Shrine of the Book of Mulling

The Evangelist John is shown in a fully frontal pose. He holds a book or tablet of some kind, with his hand over it and his heart. This could be a reference to his position as the scribe of one of the Gospels. He has blond hair and blue eyes, and his robes are in shades of rich blue and red. The robes flow around him, forming interlaced, almost geometric shapes, echoing those around the border. There is a border surrounding the portrait. In this case, John's halo, a marker of his holy status, breaks the frame created by the border. The border is relatively sparse above and below the Evangelist, however on the left and the right elaborate designs have been created within the border.

Interlaced line-work fills squares in all four corners, two panels on the left and the right feature interlocking animal shapes, elongated and interlaced to the point of being nearly unrecognizable. Both of these patterns call to mind the style of metalwork also popular in this period. The colors are faded, but the richness of this image is evident by the use of gold and the immense attention to detail, making this one of the leading examples of illuminated manuscript art from this period.

== Binding and conservation ==
Prior to 1977, the Book of Mulling had a binding that had been done by the British Museum in the late 19th century in a style similar to that of Codex Usserianus Primus, with its (now) individual vellum folios glued onto paper panels sewn into a leather binding. The book was rebound in 1977 by conservator Anthony Cains in a traditional style similar to the Book of Kells' current binding, sewn on vegetable-fibre double cords laced into quarter-sawn oak boards and covered with white alum-tawed skin in a quarter style. When the book was examined by conservators in 2016 as it was prepared for imaging, Cains' 1977 binding was found to be in good condition and required little remedial work.

== Early Irish Manuscript Project ==
The Early Irish Manuscripts Project is an initiative by the Library of Trinity College Dublin to conserve, research, and digitize the most important early medieval insular Gospel manuscripts in their collection, including the Book of Mulling, Book of Dimma, Garland of Howth, and Codex Usserianus Primus. This project has encouraged new research on these manuscripts, as well as greater access to them, as they are available online. The goal of the Early Irish Manuscript Project is to encourage and facilitate new research on the manuscripts in the collection of Trinity College Dublin. Non-destructive pigment analysis was used in the research.

== Bibliography ==
- Doyle, Peter. "The Text of Saint Luke's Gospel in the Book of Mulling." Proceedings of the Royal Irish Academy 73 C 6, 1973
- Henry, Franciose. Irish Art in the Early Christian Period. London: Methuen & Co., 1940
- Henry, Francoise and Genevieve Marsh-Micheli, Studies in Early Christian and Medieval Irish Art, Vol. II. Manuscript Illumination. London: The Pindar Press, 1984
- Lawlor, Hugh Jackson. Chapters on the Book of Mulling. Edinburgh, 1897. Available from Internet Archive
- Nees, Lawrence. "The Colophon Drawing in the Book of Mulling. A Supposed Irish Monastery Plan and the Tradition of Terminal Illustration in Early Medieval Manuscripts." Cambridge Medieval Celtic Studies 5 (1983)
- O'Neill, Timothy. The Irish Hand: Scribes and Their Manuscripts From the Earliest Times. Cork: Cork University Press, 2014. ISBN 978-1-7820-5092-6
- Sterick, Robert D. "The plan of the evangelist portrait pages in the 'Book of Mulling'." Journal of the Royal Society of Antiquaries of Ireland 121 (1991)
