= Pastoral Care (Troyes, Bibliothèque Municipale, MS 504) =

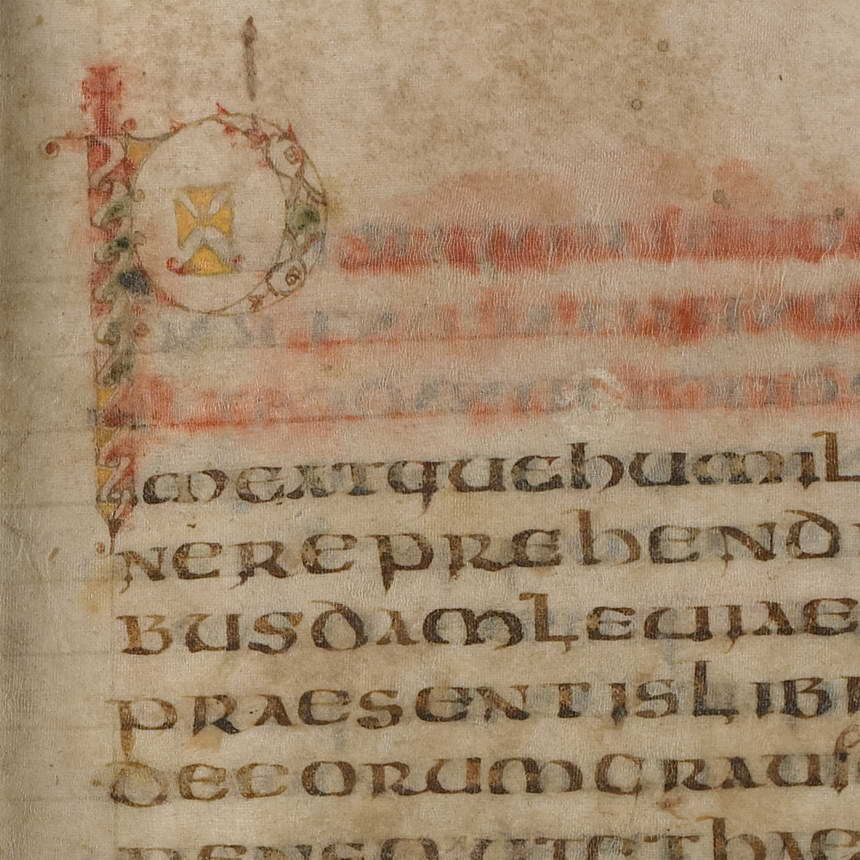
Start of the main text; the first three lines are also in coloured ink, which has run or faded.

Troyes, Bibliothèque Municipale, MS 504 is an early 7th-century illuminated manuscript of the Pastoral Care by Pope Gregory I. It was probably written in Rome about AD 600, whilst Gregory was still alive, and contains his final revised text.

It is written in an uncial script. There are about twenty-five long lines per page. There are no divisions between words. The only ornamentation in the manuscript is penwork initials in red, green and yellow, and coloured text for the first lines after them. It is one of the oldest complete manuscript books in existence.

The initial shown makes an interesting comparison with the opening initial of the Bobbio Jerome from about twenty years later, produced in North Italy by an outpost of the Hiberno-Scottish mission. This shows characteristics typical of Insular art, but in other ways is not dissimilar to this one.
