= Pastoral Care =

Book by Pope Gregory I

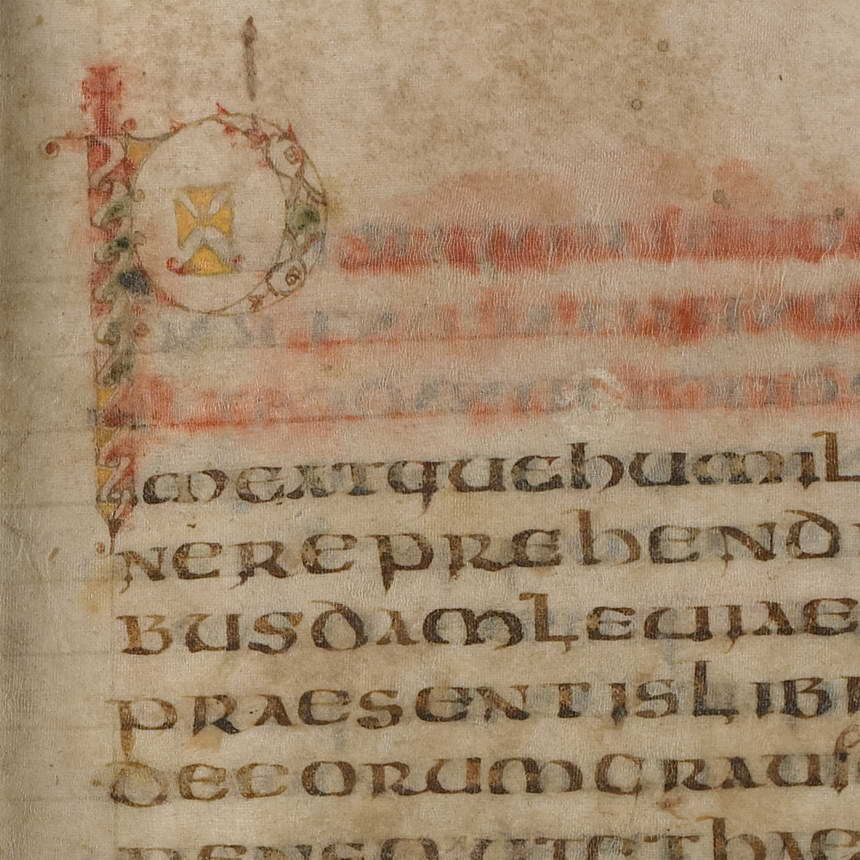
Start of the text in the Troyes manuscript of ca. 600 (see below); the first three lines are also in coloured ink, which has run or faded.

The Book of Pastoral Rule (Latin: Liber Regulae Pastoralis, Regula Pastoralis or Cura Pastoralis — sometimes translated into English Pastoral Care) is a treatise on the responsibilities of the clergy written by Pope Gregory I around the year 590, shortly after his papal inauguration. It became one of the most influential works on the topic ever written. The title was that used by Gregory when sending a copy to his friend Leander of Seville. The text was addressed to John, the bishop of Ravenna, as a response to a query from him. Gregory later revised the text somewhat.

== Description ==
The personal, intellectual and moral standards Gregory enjoined parish priests to possess, though noble, were considered in certain quarters to be unrealistic given the limitations imposed by 6th century realities. For example, one letter from the Bishop of Cartagena (Book II, letter 54 in Gregory's collected correspondence) praises the book, but expresses a reserve that it might prove beyond ordinary capacities.

The influence of the book, however, was vast. After reading the Regulae, the Byzantine Emperor Maurice directed that it be translated and distributed to every bishop within the empire (Demacopoulos). Indeed, among the works of all the Latin authors in the patristic period, Gregory's alone were translated into Greek during his own lifetime.

In the West, the book also retained its significance and broad dissemination.

A page from a contemporary copy of Alfred the Great's translation of Pastoral Care into Anglo-Saxon. This copy was sent to the bishop of Worcester.

That the book had been taken to England by Augustine of Canterbury— who was sent to the Kingdom of Kent by Gregory in 597— was noted in the preface to it written by Alfred the Great, who in the late 9th century translated it into Old English as part of a project to improve education in Anglo-Saxon England. In addition to details of his translation methodology, the extensive preface describes the rationale and intentions behind the project: even hundreds of years after it was written, the work was still seen as the most essential guide for pastors, and Alfred wished every bishop in his kingdom to have a copy for the benefit of the less-educated clergy.

Alfred the Great's translation is kept at the Bodleian Library, Oxford, and is the oldest surviving book written in English. In May 2011, it was inscribed in UNESCO's UK Memory of the World Register.

Beyond England, Gregory's Regulae was recommended to Charlemagne's bishops at a series of councils held in 813, and a letter of Hincmar, Archbishop of Rheims 845–882, notes that a copy of it, together with the Book of Canons, was given into the hands of bishops before the altar at their consecration (Schaff).

Among the numerous manuscripts of these widely read Regulae, perhaps the oldest is Troyes, Bibliothèque Municipale, MS 504; it is an early seventh-century manuscript in an uncial script without divisions between words, probably originating in Rome. There are about twenty-five long lines per page. The only ornamentation in the manuscript consists of penwork initials in red, green and yellow (above). It contains the full revised text.
