= Codex Usserianus Primus =

7th-century Old Latin Gospel Book

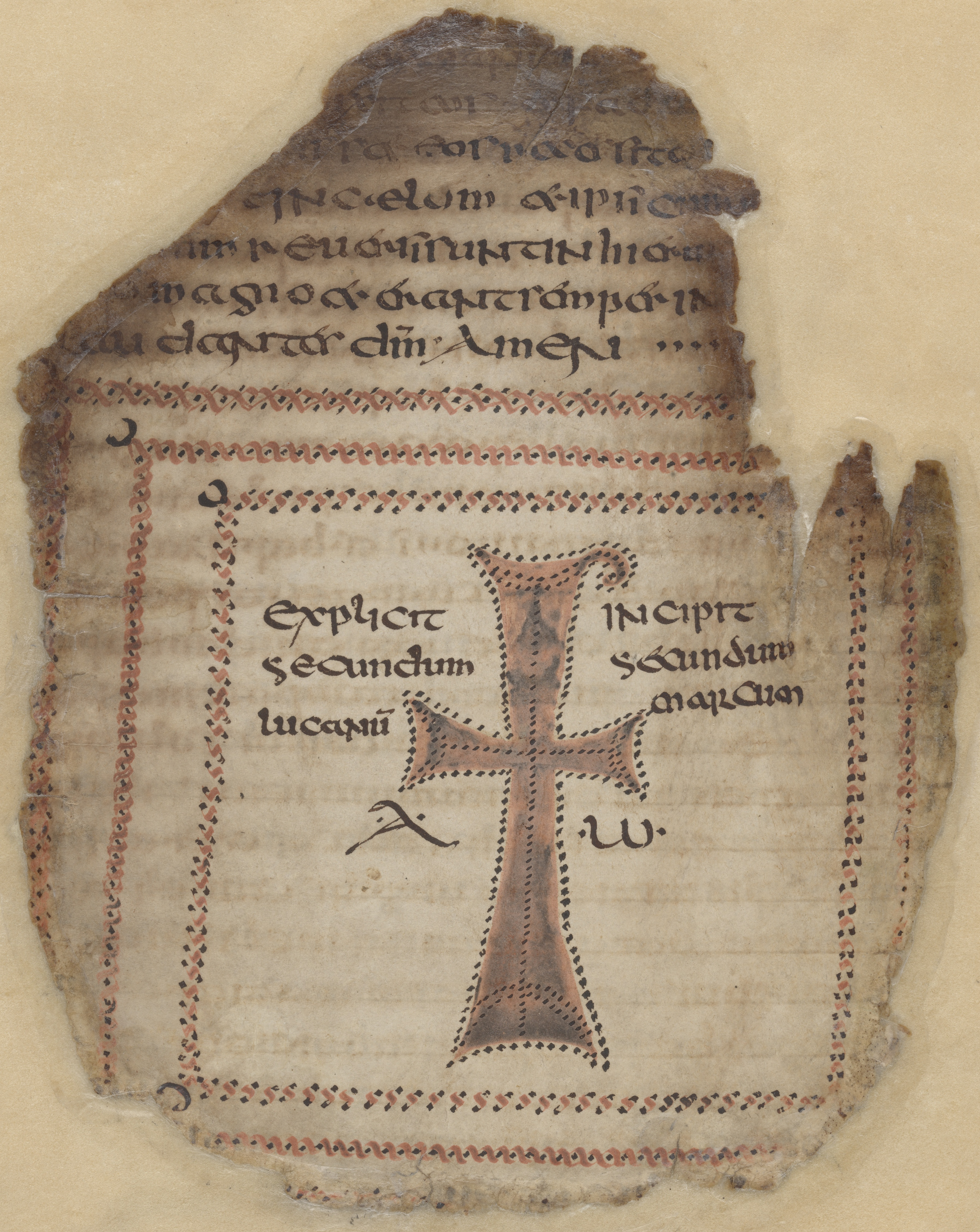
Folio 149v contains the only surviving decoration in the Codex Usserianus Primus.

Codex Usserianus Primus (Dublin, Trinity College Library, 55) is an early 7th-century Old Latin Gospel Book. It is dated palaeographically to the 6th or 7th century. It is designated by r (traditional system).

== Description ==
The manuscript is damaged, with the leaves being fragmentary and discoloured. The remains of the approximately 180 vellum folios have been remounted on paper. It contains the text of the Pericope Adulterae as do many Old Latin manuscripts of the Italian branch. It contains some lacunae (Matthew 1:1–15:16; 15:31–16:13; 21:4–21; 28:16–20; John 1:1–15; Mark 14:58–15:8; 15:29–16:20). It names at least one of the two thieves crucified with Jesus as Capnatas (Luke 23:32).

The order of Gospels is Western: Matthew, John, Luke, and Mark. It represents European Old Latin recension.

The manuscript has a single remaining decoration, a cross outlined in black dots at the end of the Luke (fol. 149v). The cross is between the Greek letters alpha and omega. It is also flanked by the explicit (an ending phrase) for Luke and the incipit (first few words) for Mark. The entire assemblage is contained within a triple square frame of dots and small "s" marks with crescent shaped corner motifs. The cross has been compared to similar crosses found in the Bologna Lactantius, the Paris St. John, and the Valerianus Gospels. Initials on folios 94, 101 and 107 have been set off by small red dots. This represents the first appearance of decoration by "dotting" around text, a motif which would be important in later Insular manuscripts.

There are some paleographic similarities with early manuscripts produced at the monastery at Bobbio, such as the Ambrosiana Jerome and the Ambrosiana Orosius. However, it is now thought to have been produced in Ireland. It may therefore be the earliest surviving Irish codex.

The manuscript's traditional name can be translated as "the First Book of Uss(h)er" and refers to James Ussher, Archbishop of Armagh. Despite the name, it is doubtful that Ussher ever actually owned the manuscript.

The text of the codex was collated in 1884 by T. K. Abbott who also gave the manuscript its name.

Currently it is housed at Trinity College (55) at Dublin and can be read online using the Digital Collections portal of the Trinity College library.

== See also ==
- List of New Testament Latin manuscripts
- Codex Usserianus II

== Bibliography ==
- Abbott, T. K., Catalogue of the manuscripts in Trinity College, Dublin, 7, 1900.
- Abbott, T. K., Evangeliorum versio antihieronymiana ex codice Usseriano, 2 vols., 1884.
- Abbott, T. K., ed, The book of Trinity college, Dublin, 1591–1891, 1892.
- Aberg, N., The Occident and the Orient in the art of the seventh century, I; The British Isles, Stockholm, 1943.
- Alexander, J. J. G., Insular Manuscripts: 6th to the 9th Century, no. 1, London, 1978.
- Gilbert, J. T., Facsimiles of National Manuscripts of Ireland, Part I, vi, pl. II, 1848.
- Henry, K. Irish Art in the Early Christian Period (to 800 A.D), 62, 64, 187, pl. 58London, 1965
- Kenney, J. F., The Sources for Early History of Ireland, no. 453, New York, 1929.
- Lowe, E. A., Codices Latini Antiquiores Vol. II no. 271,
- McGurk, P., Latin Gospel Books from A.D. 400 to A.D. 800, no. 84, Paris, Brussels, 1961.
- Nordenfalk, C., Celtic and Anglo-Saxon painting. Book Illumination in the British Isles 600–800, 13, fig. 1, New York, 1976.
- Nordenfalk, C, 'Before the Book of Durrow', Acta Archaeologica, 18, 1947, 147 ff., fig. 5
- Palaeographical Society: Facsimiles of Manuscripts and Innscriptions, ed. E. A. Bond, E. M Thompson, G. F. Warner, 2nd series, pl. 33, London, 1884–94.
- Westwood, J. O., Palaeographia sacra pictoris, no. 19, London, 1843–5.
