= Insular art =

Post-Roman British and Irish style of art

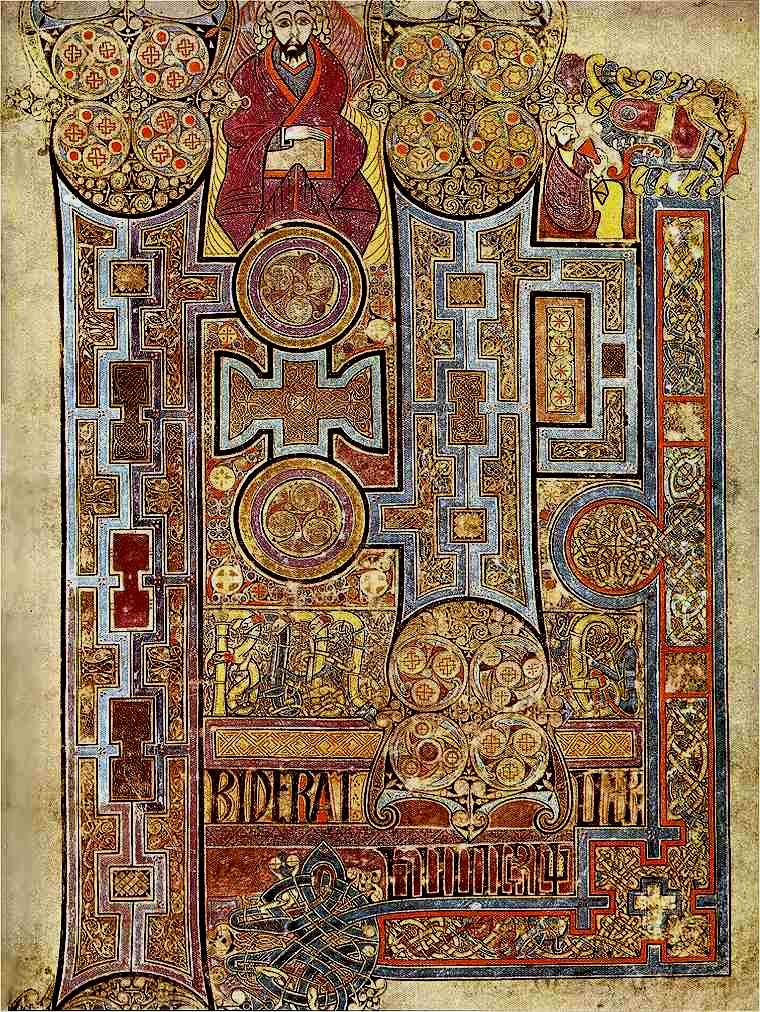
This page (folio 292r) of the Book of Kells contains the lavishly decorated text that opens the Gospel of John.

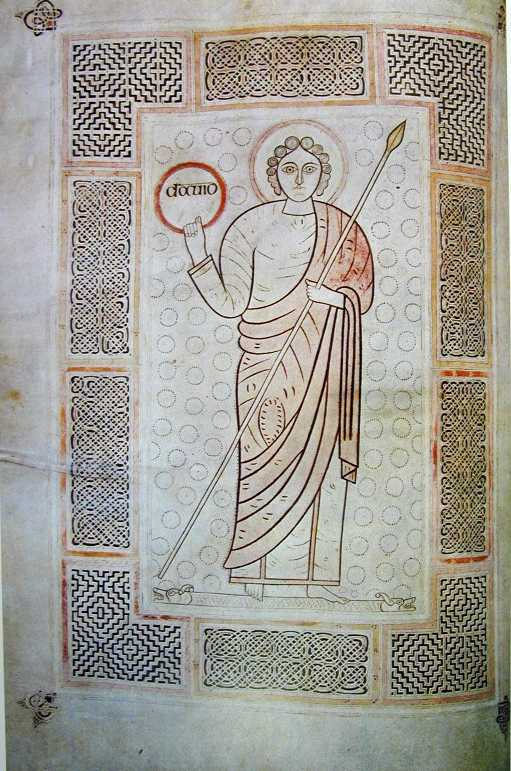
David from the Durham Cassiodorus, early 8th century (?), Jarrow

Insular art, also known as Hiberno-Saxon art, was produced in the post-Roman era of Great Britain and Ireland. The term derives from insula, the Latin term for "island," as in this period Britain and Ireland shared a largely common style different from that of the rest of Europe. Insular art is usually classified as early medieval art, and sometimes more specifically as Migration Period art. It is the combination of these two traditions that gives the style its special character.

Most Insular art originates from the Irish monastic movement of Celtic Christianity, or metalwork for the secular elite, and the period begins around 600 with the combining of Celtic and Anglo-Saxon styles. One major distinctive feature is interlace decoration, in particular the interlace decoration as found at Sutton Hoo, in East Anglia. This is now applied to decorating new types of objects mostly copied from the Mediterranean world, above all the codex or book.

The finest period of the style was brought to an end by the disruption to monastic centres and aristocratic life caused by the Viking raids which began in the late 8th century. These are presumed to have interrupted work on the Book of Kells; no later Gospel books are as heavily or finely illuminated as the masterpieces of the 8th century. In England the style merged into Anglo-Saxon art around 900, whilst in Ireland the style continued until the 12th century, when it merged into Romanesque art. Ireland, Scotland and the kingdom of Northumbria in Northern England are the most important centres, but examples were found also in southern England, Wales and in Continental Europe, especially Gaul (modern France), in centres founded by the Hiberno-Scottish mission and Anglo-Saxon missions. The influence of Insular art affected all subsequent European medieval art, especially in the decorative elements of Romanesque and Gothic manuscripts.

Surviving examples of Insular art are mainly illuminated manuscripts, metalwork and carvings in stone, especially stone crosses. Surfaces are highly decorated with intricate patterning, with no attempt to give an impression of depth, volume or recession. The best examples include the Book of Kells, Lindisfarne Gospels, Book of Durrow, brooches such as the Tara Brooch and the Ruthwell Cross. Carpet pages are a characteristic feature of Insular manuscripts, although historiated initials (an Insular invention), canon tables and figurative miniatures, especially Evangelist portraits, are also common.

== Designation ==
This sense of the term as Insular (relating to one or more islands) derives from the phrase Insular script, first cited by the OED in 1908, though it seems clear from their 1908 quotation that the usage was already established; Carola Hicks dates the first use to 1901. It is also used by linguists for the Insular Celtic languages Initially used mainly to describe the style of decoration of illuminated manuscripts, which are certainly the most numerous type of major surviving objects using the style, the term is now used more widely across all the arts, and indeed for peoples, as in "Insular Celts" . It has the advantage of recognising the unity of styles across Britain and Ireland, while avoiding the use of the term British Isles, a sensitive topic in Ireland, and also circumventing arguments about the origins of the style, and the place of creation of specific works, which were often fierce in the 20th century and may be reviving in the 21st.

Some sources distinguish between a "wider period between the 5th and 11th centuries, from the departure of the Romans to the beginnings of the Romanesque style" and a "more specific phase from the 6th to 9th centuries, between the conversion to Christianity and the Viking settlements". C. R. Dodwell, on the other hand, says that in Ireland "the Insular style continued almost unchallenged until the Anglo-Norman invasion of 1170; indeed examples of it occur even as late as the thirteenth and fourteenth centuries".

== Insular decoration ==
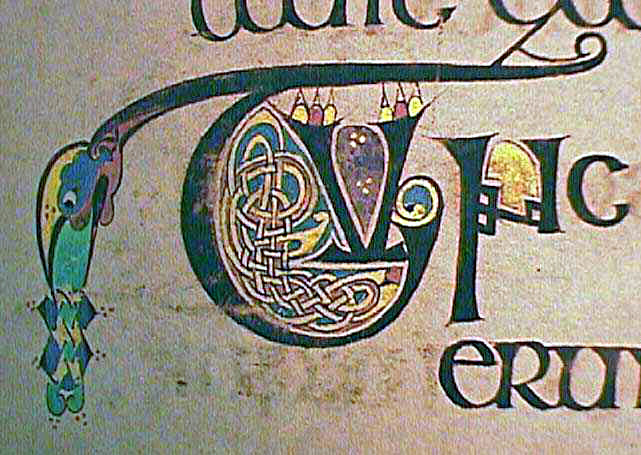
One of hundreds of small initials from the Book of Kells

The Insular style is most famous for its highly dense, intricate and imaginative decoration, which takes elements from several earlier styles. Late Iron Age Celtic art or "Ultimate La Tène", gave the love of spirals, triskeles, circles and other geometric motifs. These were combined with animal forms probably mainly deriving from the Germanic version of the general Eurasian animal style, though also from Celtic art, where heads terminating scrolls were common. Interlace was used by both these traditions, as well as Roman art (for example in floor mosaics) and other possible influences such as Coptic art, and its use was taken to new levels in Insular art, where it was combined with the other elements already mentioned.

There is no attempt to represent depth in manuscript painting, with all the emphasis on a brilliantly patterned surface. In early works the human figure was shown in the same geometric fashion as animal figures, but reflections of a classical figure style spread as the period went on, probably mostly from the southern Anglo-Saxon regions, though northern areas also had direct contacts with the Continent. The origins of the overall format of the carpet page have often been related to Roman floor mosaics, Coptic carpets and manuscript paintings, without general agreement being reached among scholars.

== Background ==
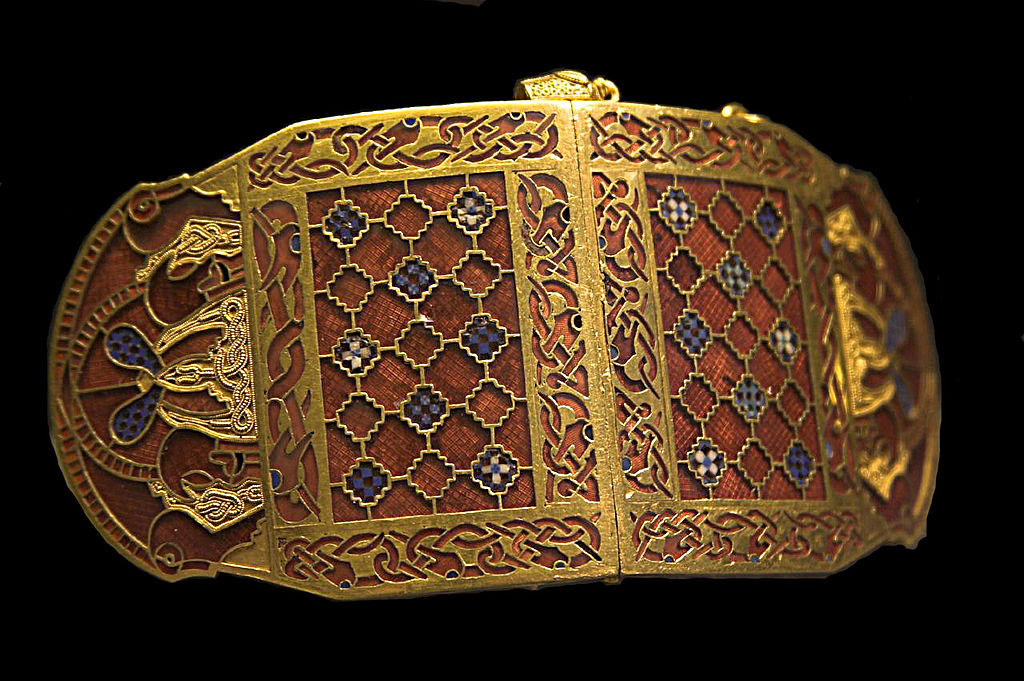
Early Anglo-Saxon shoulder-clasps from Sutton Hoo, early 7th century. Gold, garnet, and millefiori glass.

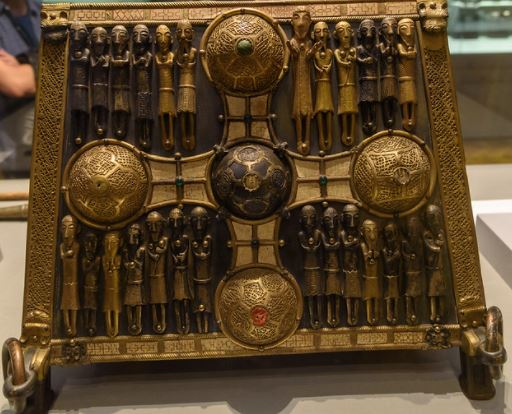
Front plate of the 12th century Saint Manchan's Shrine

Unlike contemporary Byzantine art, and that of most major periods, Insular art does not come from a society where common stylistic influences were spread across a great number of types of object in art, applied art and decorative art. Across all the islands society was effectively entirely rural, buildings were rudimentary, and architecture has no Insular style. Although related objects in many more perishable media certainly existed and have not survived, it is clear that both religious and secular Insular patrons expected individual objects of dazzling virtuosity, that were all the more dazzling because of the lack of visual sophistication in the world in which they were seen.

Especially in Ireland, the clerical and secular elites were often very closely linked; some Irish abbacies were held for generations among a small kin-group. Ireland was divided into very small "kingdoms", almost too many for historians to keep track of, whilst in Britain there was a smaller number of generally larger kingdoms. Both the Celtic (Irish and Pictish) and Anglo-Saxon elites had long traditions of metalwork of the finest quality, much of it used for the personal adornment of both sexes of the elite. The Insular style arises from the meeting of their two styles, Celtic and Anglo-Saxon animal style, in a Christian context, and with some awareness of Late Antique style. This was especially so in their application to the book, which was a new type of object for both traditions, as well as to metalwork.

The role of the Kingdom of Northumbria in the formation of the new style appears to have been pivotal. The northernmost Anglo-Saxon kingdom continued to expand into areas with Celtic populations, but often leaving those populations largely intact in areas such as Dál Riata, Elmet and the Kingdom of Strathclyde. The Irish monastery at Iona was established by Saint Columba (Colum Cille) in 563, when Iona was part of a Dál Riata that included territory in both Ireland and modern Scotland. Although the first conversion of a Northumbrian king, that of Edwin in 627, was effected by clergy from the Gregorian Mission to Kent, it was the Celtic Christianity of Iona that was initially more influential in Northumbria, founding Lindisfarne on the eastern coast as a satellite in 635. However Northumbria remained in direct contact with Rome and other important monastic centres were founded by Wilfrid and Benedict Biscop who looked to Rome, and at the Synod of Whitby it was the Roman practices that were upheld, while the Iona contingent walked out, not adopting the Roman Easter dating until 715.

What had finally settled into a broad consensus as to the origins of the style may be disturbed by the continuing assessment of the large numbers of decorated metalwork finds in the Staffordshire Hoard, found in 2009, and to a lesser extent the Prittlewell princely burial from Essex, found in 2003.

== Metalwork ==
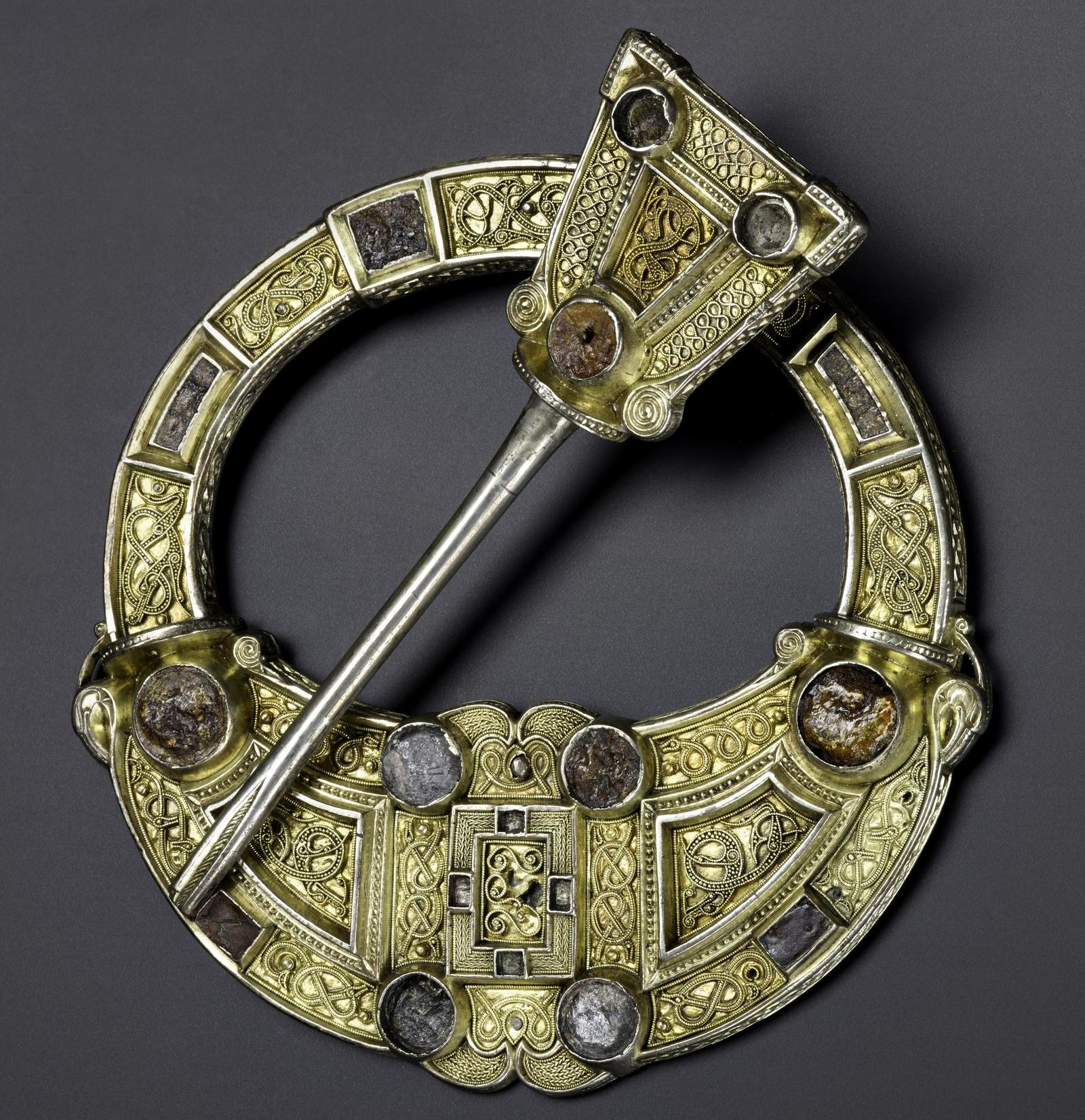
The Hunterston Brooch, Irish c. 700, is cast in silver, mounted with gold, silver and amber decoration.

Christianity discouraged the burial of grave goods so that, at least from the Anglo-Saxons, there are a larger number of pre-Christian survivals than those from later periods. The majority of examples that survive from the Christian period have been found in archaeological contexts that suggest they were rapidly hidden, lost or abandoned. There are a few exceptions, notably arm-shaped reliquaries such as the Shrine of Saint Lachtin's Arm, and portable book-shaped ("cumdachs") and house-shaped shrines for books or relics, several of which have been continuously owned, mostly by churches on the Continent—though the Monymusk Reliquary has always been in Scotland.

In general it is clear that most survivals are only by chance, and that we have only fragments of some types of object—in particular the largest and least portable. The highest quality survivals are either secular jewellery, the largest and most elaborate pieces probably for male wearers, or tableware or altarware in what were apparently very similar styles—some pieces cannot be confidently assigned between altar and royal dining-table. It seems possible, even likely, that the finest church pieces were made by secular workshops, often attached to a royal household, though other pieces were made by monastic workshops. The evidence suggests that Irish metalworkers produced most of the best pieces, however the finds from the royal burial at Sutton Hoo, from the far east of England and at the beginning of the period, are as fine in design and workmanship as any Irish pieces. Even excepting the existence of workshops in the mid-to-late medieval period, the craftsman may not always have had been responsible for the full design of the works, for example the execution of portions of the Ardagh Chalice evidences a lack of skill compared to the rest of the piece.

There are a number of large penannular brooches, including several of comparable quality to the Tara brooch. Almost all of these are in the British Museum, the National Museum of Ireland, the National Museum of Scotland, or local museums in the islands. Each of their designs is wholly individual in detail, and the workmanship is varied in technique and superb in quality. Many elements of the designs can be directly related to elements used in manuscripts. Almost all of the many techniques known in metalwork can be found in Insular work. Surviving stones used in decoration are semi-precious ones, with amber and rock crystal among the commonest, and some garnets. Coloured glass, enamel and millefiori glass, probably imported, are also used, as seen in the late 6th century Ballinderry Brooch.

The gilt-bronze Rinnegan Crucifixion Plaque (NMI, late 7th or early 8th century) is the best known of a group of nine recorded Irish metal Crucifixion plaques and is comparable in style to figures on many high crosses; it may well have come from a book cover or formed part of a larger altar frontal or high cross.

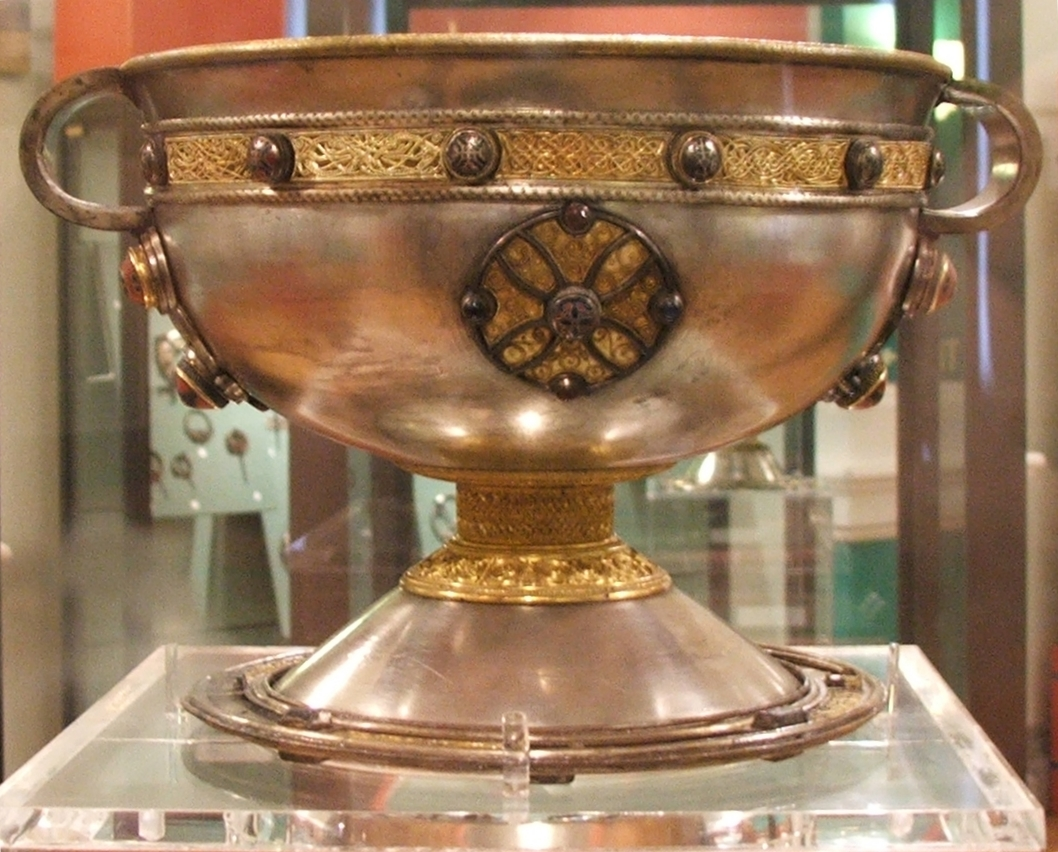
The Ardagh Chalice, c.? 750

The Ardagh Chalice and the Derrynaflan Hoard of chalice, paten with stand, strainer, and basin (only discovered in 1980) are the most outstanding pieces of church metalware to survive (only three other chalices, and no other paten, survive). These pieces are thought to come from the 8th or 9th century, but most dating of metalwork is uncertain, and comes largely from comparison with manuscripts. Only fragments remain from what were probably large pieces of church furniture, probably with metalwork on wooden frameworks, such as shrines, crosses and other items. The Insular crozier had a distinctive shape; the survivals, such as the Kells Crozier and Lismore Crozier all appear to be Irish or Scottish, and from rather late in the Insular period. These later works, which also including the 11th century River Laune and Clonmacnoise Croziers are heavily influenced by Viking art and have interlace patterns in the Ringerike or Urnes styles.

The Cross of Cong is a 12th-century Irish processional cross and reliquary that shows Insular decoration, possibly added in a deliberately revivalist spirit.

Most fully decorated manuscripts in monastic settings were treated as decorative objects for display rather than as books for study. The most fully decorated Insular manuscript of all, the Book of Kells, has several mistakes left uncorrected, the text headings necessary to make the Canon tables usable have not been added, and when it was stolen in 1006 for its cover in precious metals, it was taken from the sacristy, not the library. The book was recovered, but not the cover, as also happened with the Book of Lindisfarne. None of the major Insular manuscripts have preserved their elaborate jewelled metal covers, but we know from documentary evidence that these were as spectacular as the few remaining continental examples. The re-used metal back cover of the Lindau Gospels (now in the Morgan Library, New York) was made in southern Germany in the late 8th or early 9th century, under heavy Insular influence, and is perhaps the best indication as to the appearance of the original covers of the great Insular manuscripts, although one gold and garnet piece from the Anglo-Saxon Staffordshire Hoard, found in 2009, may be the corner of a book-cover. The Lindau design is dominated by a cross, but the whole surface of the cover is decorated, with interlace panels between the arms of the cross. The cloisonné enamel shows Italian influence, and is not found in work from the Insular homelands, but the overall effect is very like a carpet page.

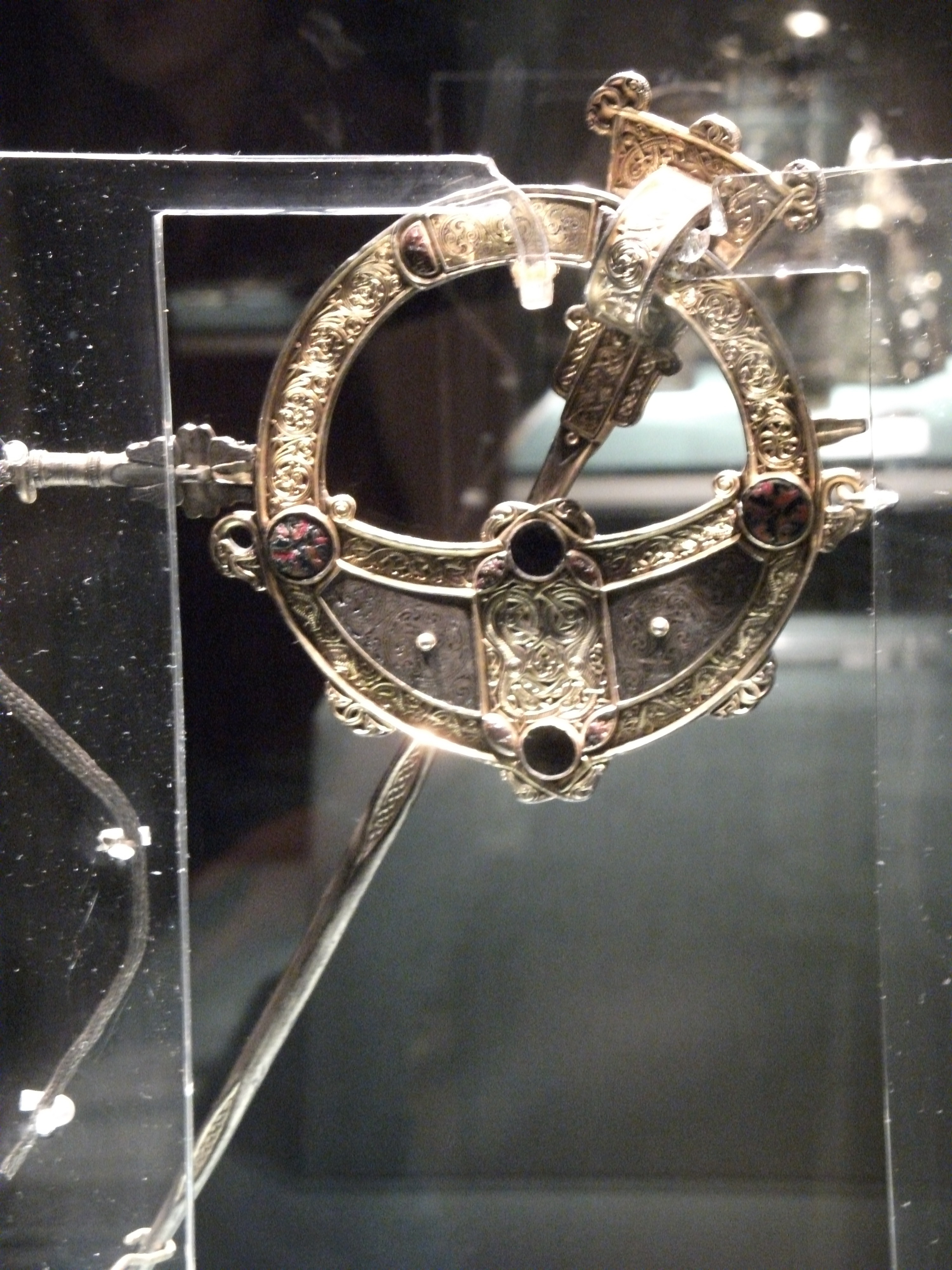
The Tara Brooch, c. 710 to 750 AD

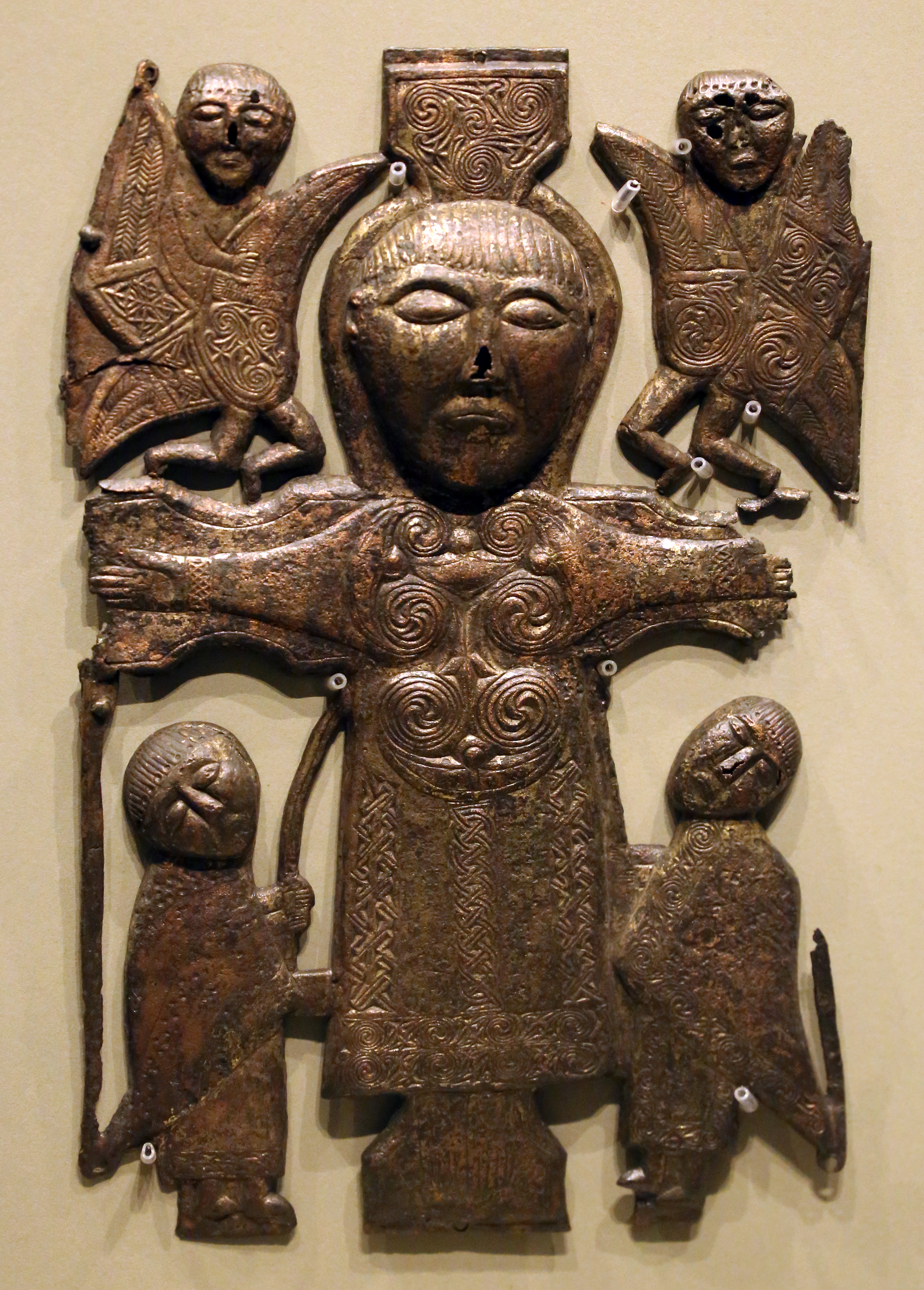
Rinnegan Crucifixion Plaque, 8th century

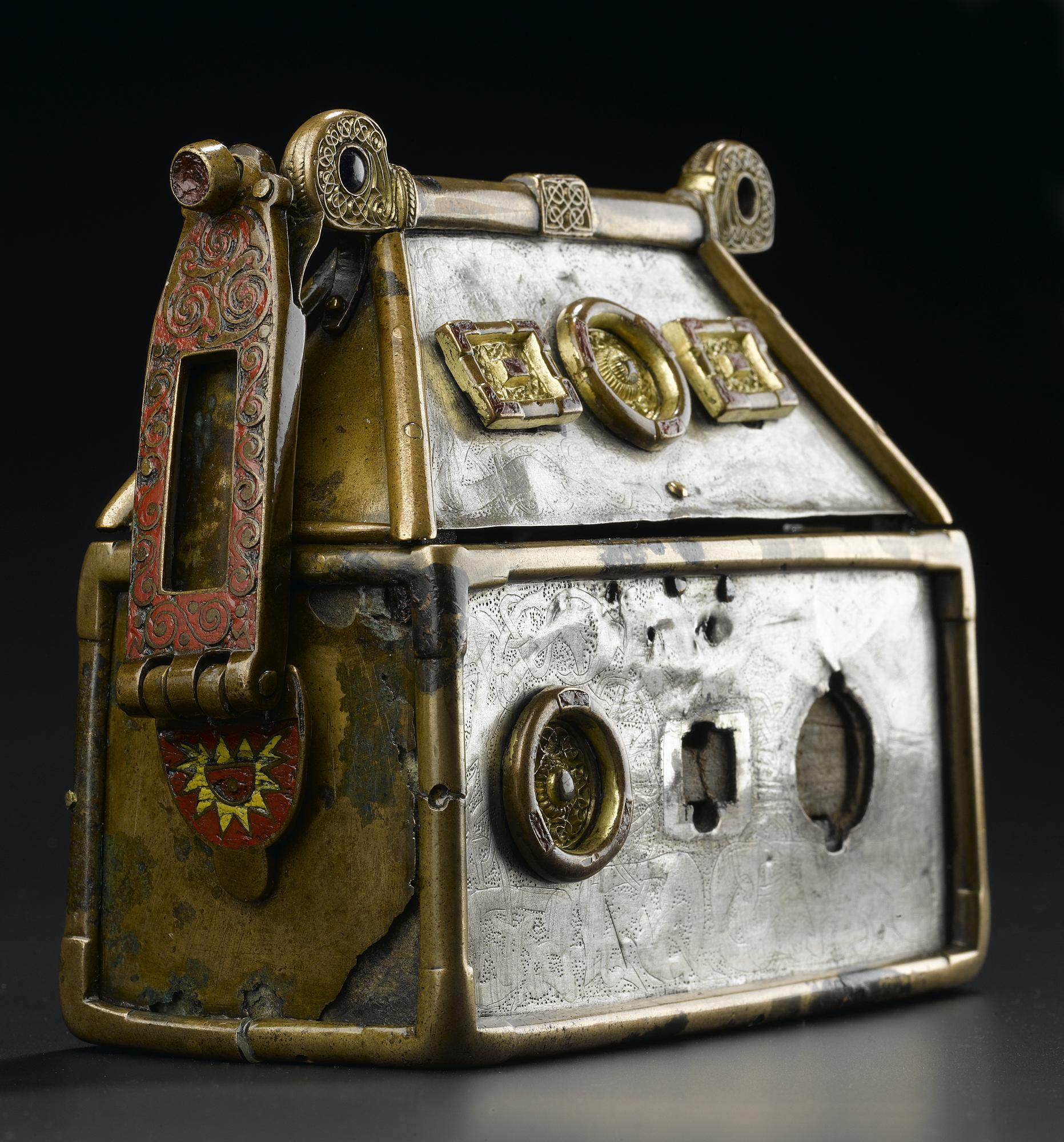
Monymusk Reliquary, 8th century

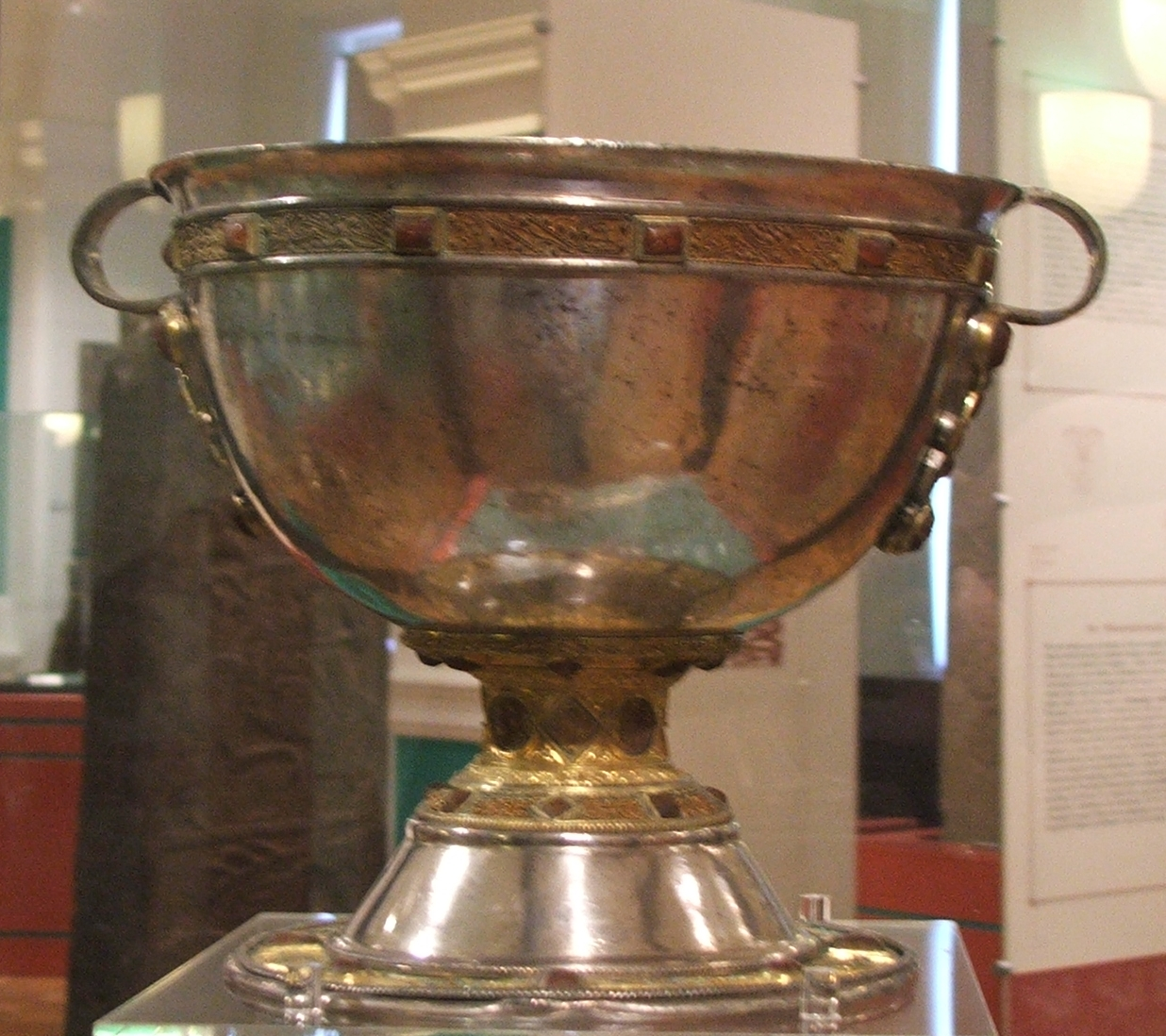
The Derrynaflan Chalice, 8th or 9th century

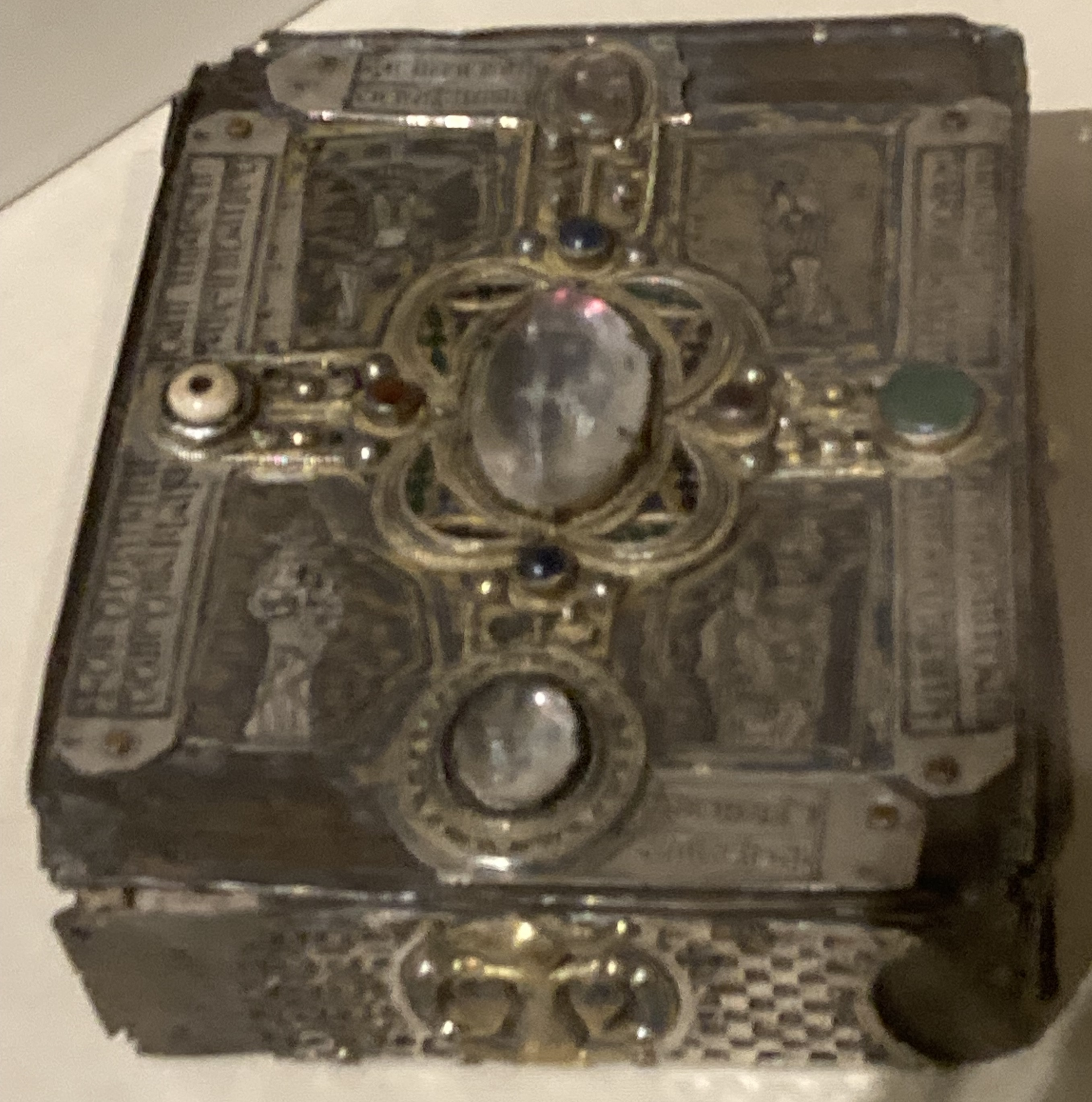
Cumdach for the Stowe Missal, c. 1026

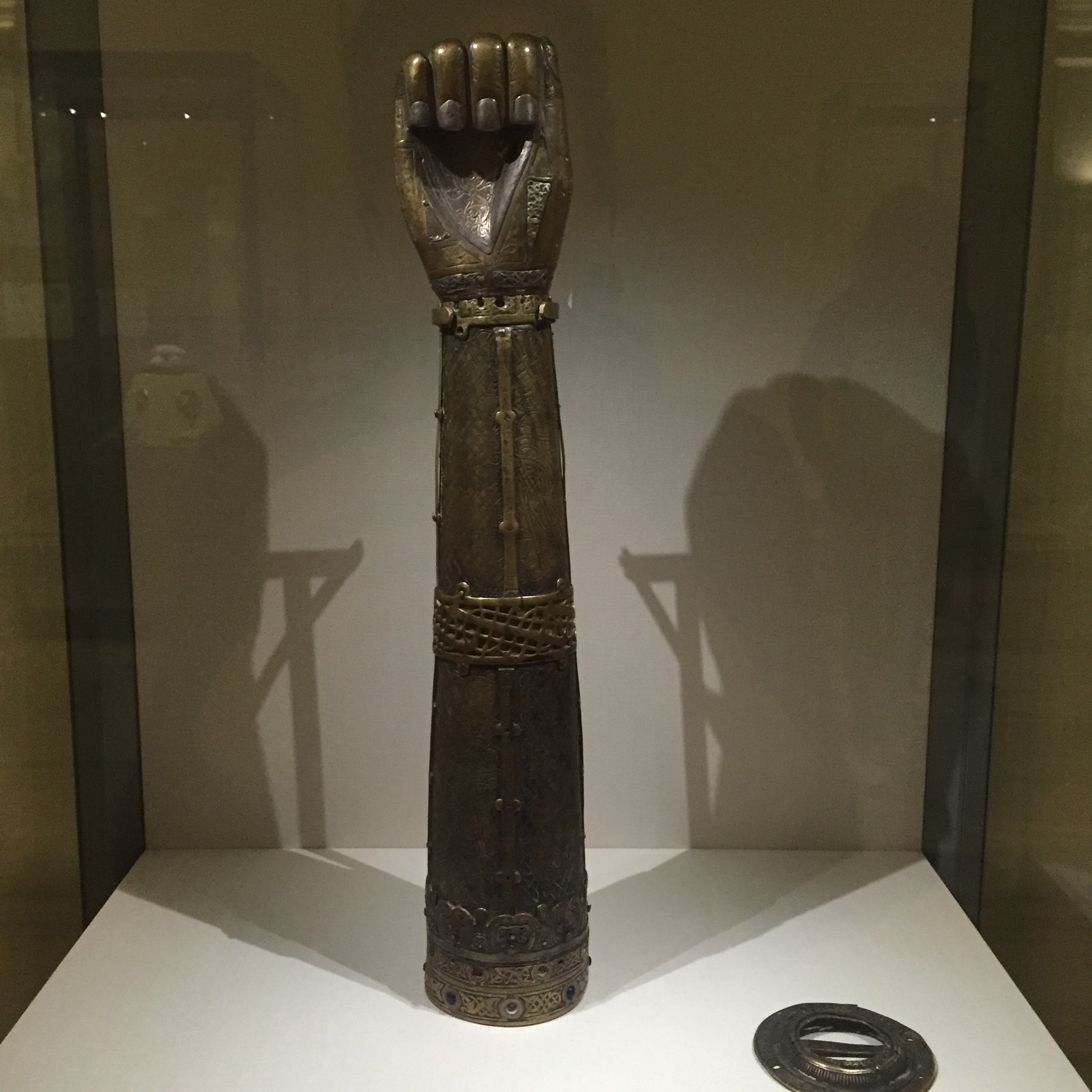
Shrine of Saint Lachtin's Arm, early 10th century

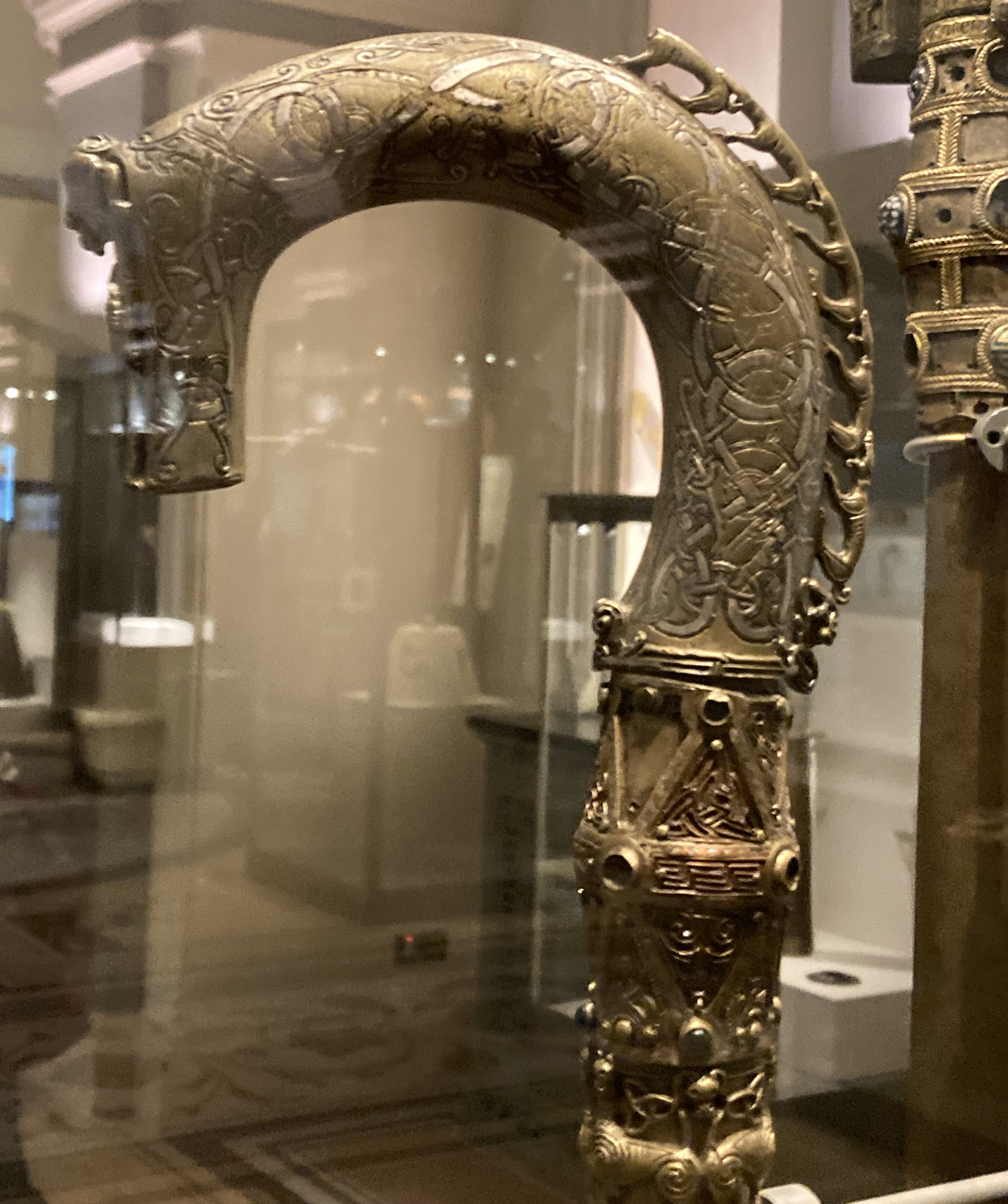
The Clonmacnoise Crozier, 11th century

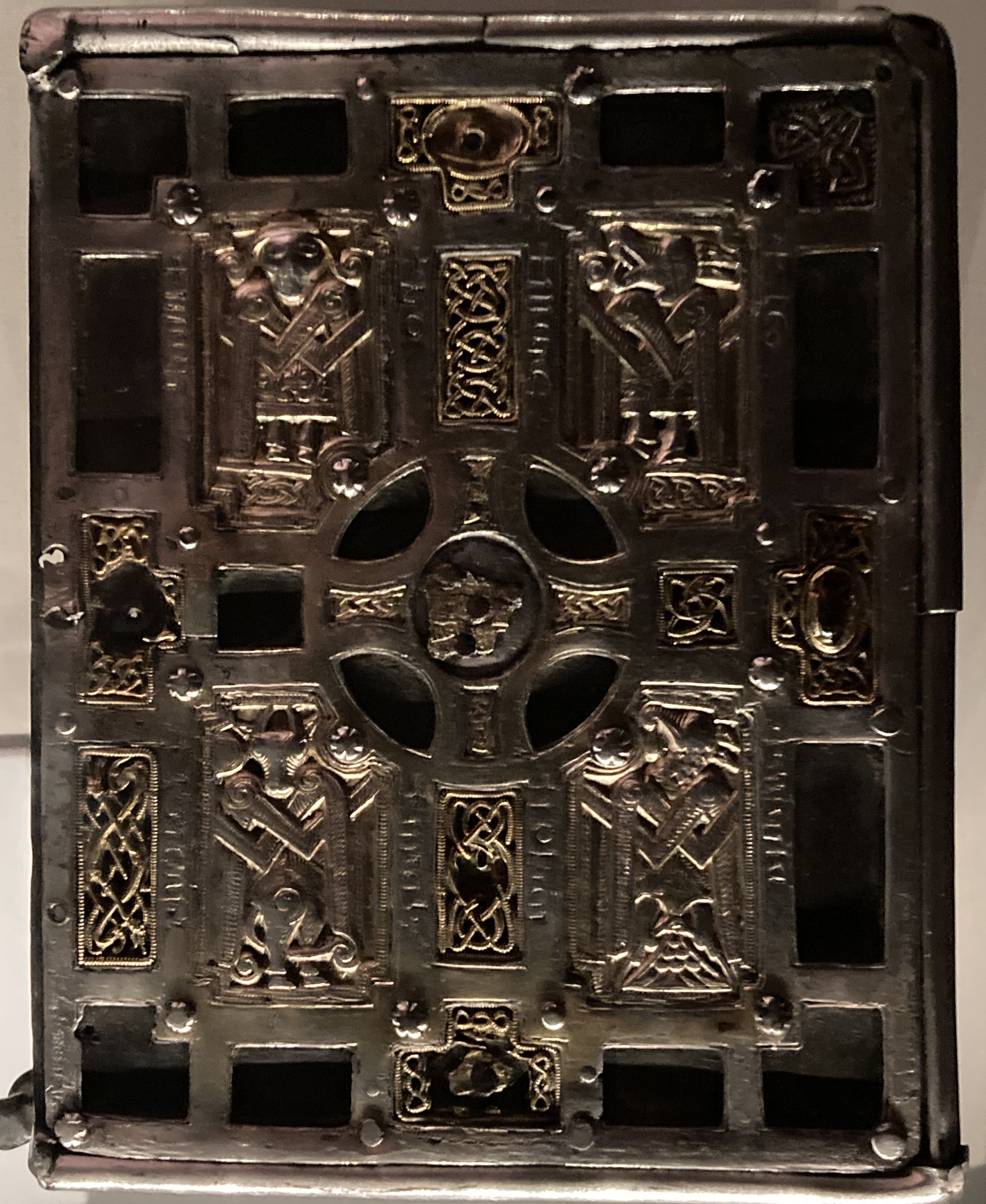
Soiscél Molaisse, metalwork added in 11th century

== Illuminated manuscripts ==
=== Notable examples ===
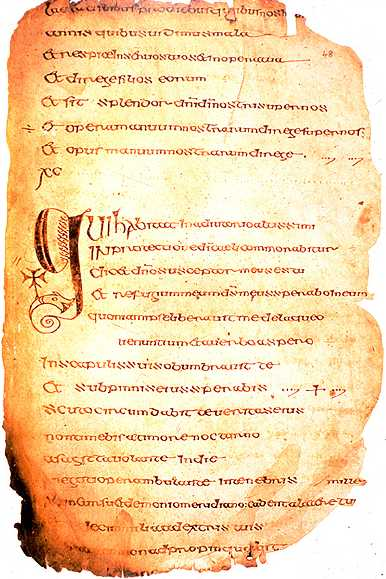
Cathach of St. Columba, 7th century

==== Cathach of St. Columba. ====
The Caltach of St. Columba is an Irish Latin psalter of the early 7th century and is possibly the oldest known Irish manuscript of any sort. It contains only decorated letters at the beginning of each Psalm, which already show distinctive traits. Not just the initial, but the first few letters are decorated, at diminishing sizes. The decoration influences the shape of the letters, and various decorative forms are mixed in a very unclassical way. Lines are already inclined to spiral and metamorphose, as in the example shown. Apart from black, some orange ink is used for dotted decoration. The classical tradition was late to use capital letters for initials at all (in Roman texts it is often very hard to even separate the words), and though by this time they were in common use in Italy, they were often set in the left margin, as though to cut them off from the rest of the text. The Insular tendency for the decoration to lunge into the text, and take over more and more of it, was a radical innovation.

==== Bobbio Jerome ====
The Bobbio Jerome which according to an inscription dates to before 622, from Bobbio Abbey, an Irish mission centre in northern Italy, has a more elaborate initial with colouring, showing Insular characteristics still more developed, even in such an outpost. From the same scriptorium and of similar date, the Bobbio Orosius has the earliest carpet page, although a relatively simple one.

==== The Durham Gospel Book Fragment ====
The Durham Gospel Book Fragment is the earliest painted Insular manuscript to survive, produced in Lindisfarne c. 650, but with only seven leaves of the book remaining, not all with illuminations. This introduces interlace, and also uses Celtic motifs drawn from metalwork. The design of two of the surviving pages relates them as a two-page spread.

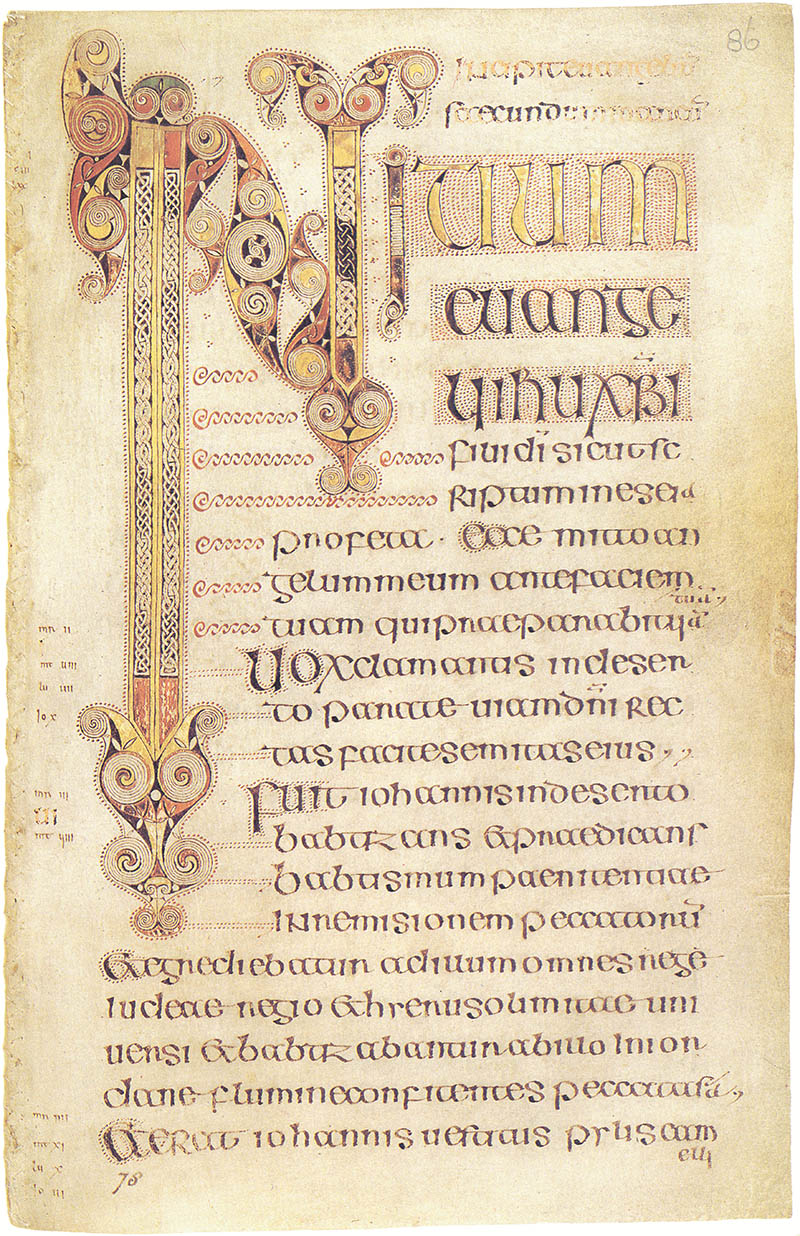
The beginning of the Gospel of Mark from the Book of Durrow.

==== Book of Durrow ====
The Book of Durrow is the earliest surviving Gospel Book with a full programme of decoration (though not all has survived): six extant carpet pages, a full-page miniature of the four evangelist's symbols, four full-page miniatures of the evangelists' symbols, four pages with very large initials, and decorated text on other pages. Many minor initial groups are decorated. Its date and place of origin remain subjects of debate, with 650–690 and Durrow in Ireland, Iona or Lindisfarne being the normal contenders. The influences on the decoration are also highly controversial, especially regarding Coptic or other Near Eastern influence.

The manuscript is decorated by cross motifs, ribbon interlace, lattice work, carpet pages, and the evangelist symbols. After large initials the following letters on the same line, or for some lines beyond, continue to be decorated at a smaller size. Dots around the outside of large initials are much used. The figures are highly stylised, and some pages use Germanic interlaced animal ornament, whilst others use the full repertoire of Celtic geometric spirals. Each page uses a different and coherent set of decorative motifs. Only four colours are used, but the viewer is hardly conscious of any limitation from this. All the elements of Insular manuscript style are already in place. The execution, though of high quality, is not as refined as in the best later books, nor is the scale of detail as small.

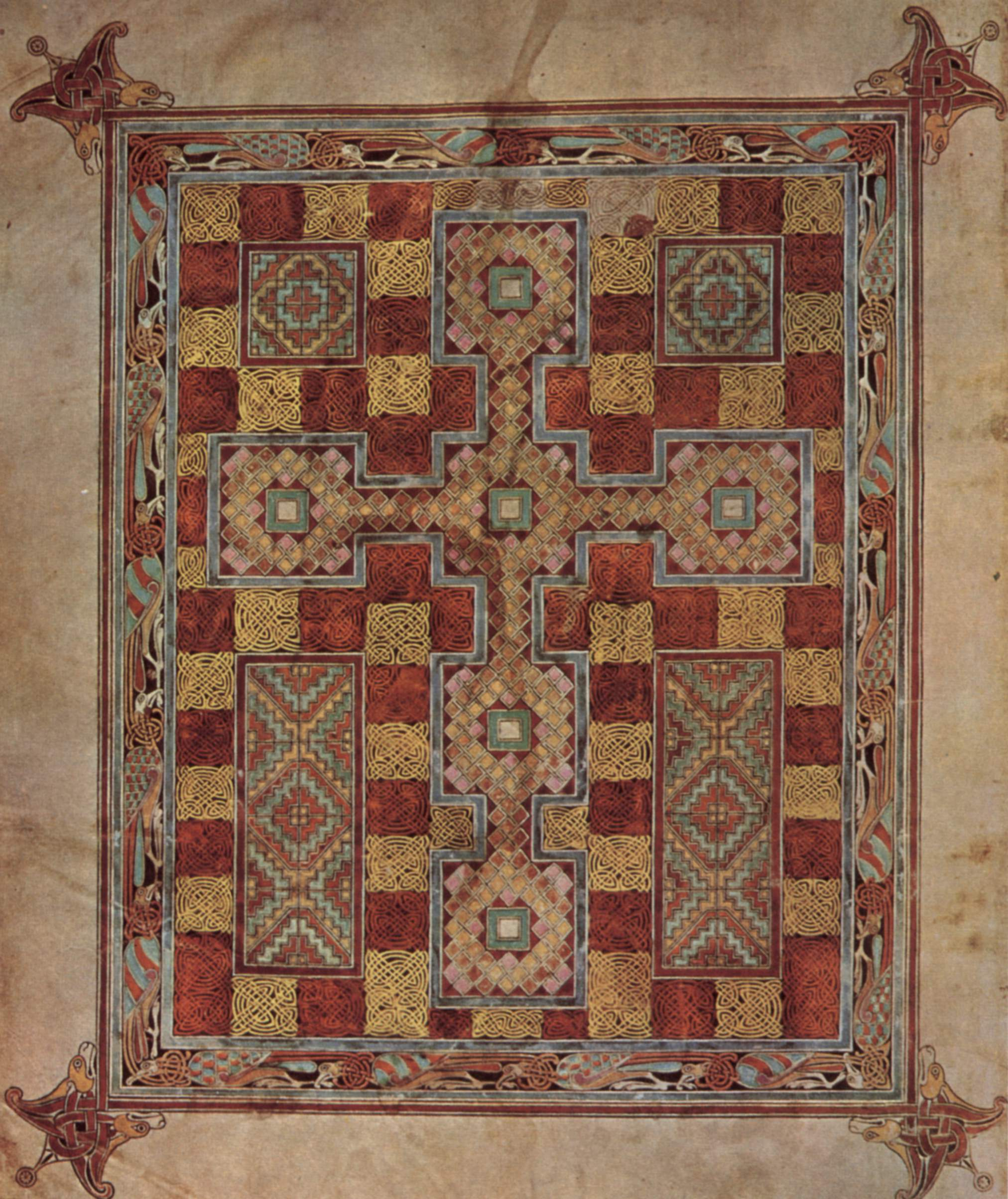
Carpet page from the Lindisfarne Gospels

==== The Lindisfarne Gospels ====
The Lindisfarne Gospels was produced in Lindisfarne by Eadfrith, Bishop of Lindisfarne, between about 690 and his death in 721 (perhaps towards the end of this period). This is a Gospel Book in the style of the Book of Durrow, but more elaborate and complex. All the letters on the pages beginning the Gospels are highly decorated in a single composition, and many two-page openings are designed as a unit, with carpet pages facing an incipit initial page at the start of each Gospel. Eadfrith was almost certainly the scribe as well as the artist. There are four Evangelist portraits, clearly derived from the classical tradition but treated without any sense of depth; the borders around them are far plainer than the decoration of the text pages, and there is clearly a sense of two styles which Eadfrith does not attempt to integrate wholly. The carpet-pages are enormously complex, and superbly executed.

==== Lichfield Gospels ====
Lichfield Gospels was likely made in Lichfield around 730, this deluxe gospel-book contains eight major decorated pages, including a stunning cross-carpet page and portraits of the evangelists Mark and Luke. The gospels of Matthew and Mark and the beginning of Luke survives. From its time in Wales, pages include marginalia representing some of the earliest examples of Old Welsh writing. The manuscript has been at Lichfield Cathedral since the late 10th century, except for a brief period during the English Civil War.

==== St. Petersburg Bede ====
The St Petersburg Bede is attributed to Monkwearmouth-Jarrow Abbey in Northumbria between about 730–746, this contains larger opening letters in which metalwork styles of decoration can clearly be seen. There are thin bands of interlace within the members of letters. It also contains the earliest historiated initial, a bust probably of Pope Gregory I, which like some other elements of the decoration, clearly derives from a Mediterranean model. Colour is used, although in a relatively restrained way.

==== The Book of Kells ====
The Book of Kells is usually dated to around 800, although sometimes up to a century earlier, the place of origin is disputed between Iona and Kells, or other locations. It is also often thought to have been begun in Iona and then continued in Ireland, after disruption from Viking raids; the book survives nearly intact but the decoration is not finished, with some parts in outline only. It is far more comprehensively decorated than any previous manuscript in any tradition, with every page (except two) having many small decorated letters. Although there is only one carpet page, the incipit initials are so densely decorated, with only a few letters on the page, that they rather take over this function. Human figures are more numerous than before, though treated in a thoroughly stylised fashion, and closely surrounded, even hemmed in, by decoration as crowded as on the initial pages. Books, however, are the most directly depicted objects in the illustrations. A few scenes such as the Temptation and Arrest of Christ are included, as well as a Madonna and Child, surrounded by angels (the earliest Madonna in a Western book). More miniatures may have been planned or executed and lost. Colours are very bright and the decoration has tremendous energy, with spiral forms predominating. Gold and silver are not used. The Book of Kells is held in Trinity College Dublin.

==== Garland of Howth ====
A lesser known Insular manuscript in Trinity College Dublin's library is the Garland of Howth, which is in a damaged condition. Two of its illuminated pages remain, decorated with the common motifs of the Insular style.

=== Other books ===
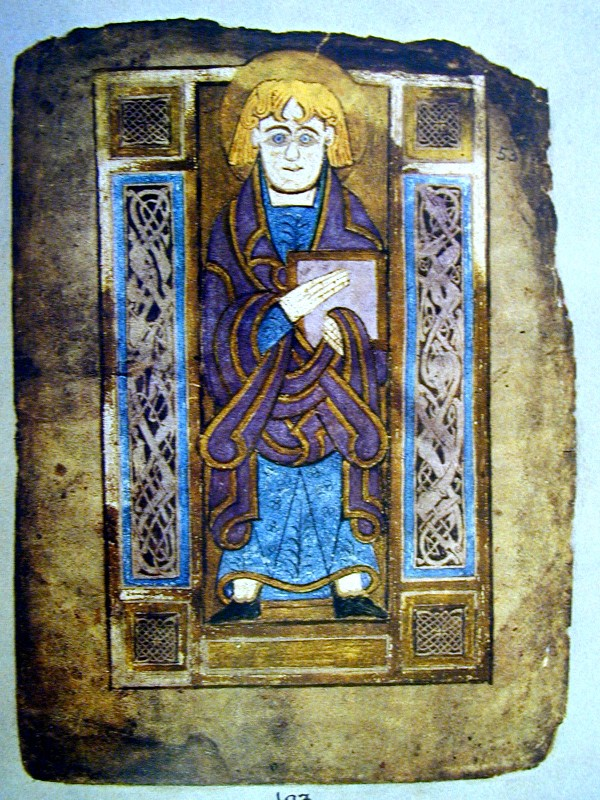
St John from the Book of Mulling

A distinctive Insular type of book is the pocket gospel book, inevitably much less decorated, but in several cases with Evangelist portraits and other decoration. Examples include the Book of Mulling, Book of Deer, Book of Dimma, Book of Armagh, and the smallest of all, the Stonyhurst Gospel (now British Library), a 7th-century Anglo-Saxon text of the Gospel of John, which belonged to St. Cuthbert and was buried with him. Its tooled goatskin cover is the oldest Western bookbinding to survive, and a virtually unique example of Insular leatherwork, in an excellent state of preservation.

Both Anglo-Saxon and Irish manuscripts have a distinctive rougher finish to their vellum, compared to the smooth-polished surface of contemporary continental and all late-medieval vellum. It appears that, in contrast to later periods, the scribes copying the text were often also the artists of the illuminations, and might include the most senior figures of their monastery.

=== Movement to Anglo-Saxon art ===
In England the pull of a Continental style operated from very early on; the Gregorian mission from Rome had brought the St. Augustine Gospels and other manuscripts now lost with them, and other books were imported from the continent early on. The 8th-century Cotton Bede shows mixed elements in the decoration, as does the Stockholm Codex Aureus of similar period, probably written in Canterbury. In the Vespasian Psalter it is clear which element is coming to dominate. All these and other members of the "Tiberius" group of manuscripts were written south of the river Humber, but the Codex Amiatinus, of before 716 from Jarrow, is written in a fine uncial script, and its only illustration is conceived in an Italianate style, with no Insular decoration; it has been suggested this was only because the volume was made for presentation to the Pope. The dating is partly known from the grant of additional land secured to raise the generations of cattle, amounting to 2,000 head in all, which were necessary to make the vellum for three complete but unillustrated Bibles, which shows the resources necessary to make the large books of the period.

Many Anglo-Saxon manuscripts written in the south, and later the north, of England show strong Insular influences until the 10th century or beyond, but the pre-dominant stylistic impulse comes from the continent of Europe; carpet-pages are not found, but many large figurative miniatures are. Panels of interlace and other Insular motifs continue to be used as one element in borders and frames ultimately classical in derivation. Many continental manuscripts, especially in areas influenced by the Celtic missions, also show such features well into the early Romanesque period. "Franco-Saxon" is a term for a school of late Carolingian illumination in north-eastern France that used Insular-style decoration, including super-large initials, sometimes in combination with figurative images typical of contemporary French styles. The "most tenacious of all the Carolingian styles", it continued until as late as the 11th century.

== Sculpture ==
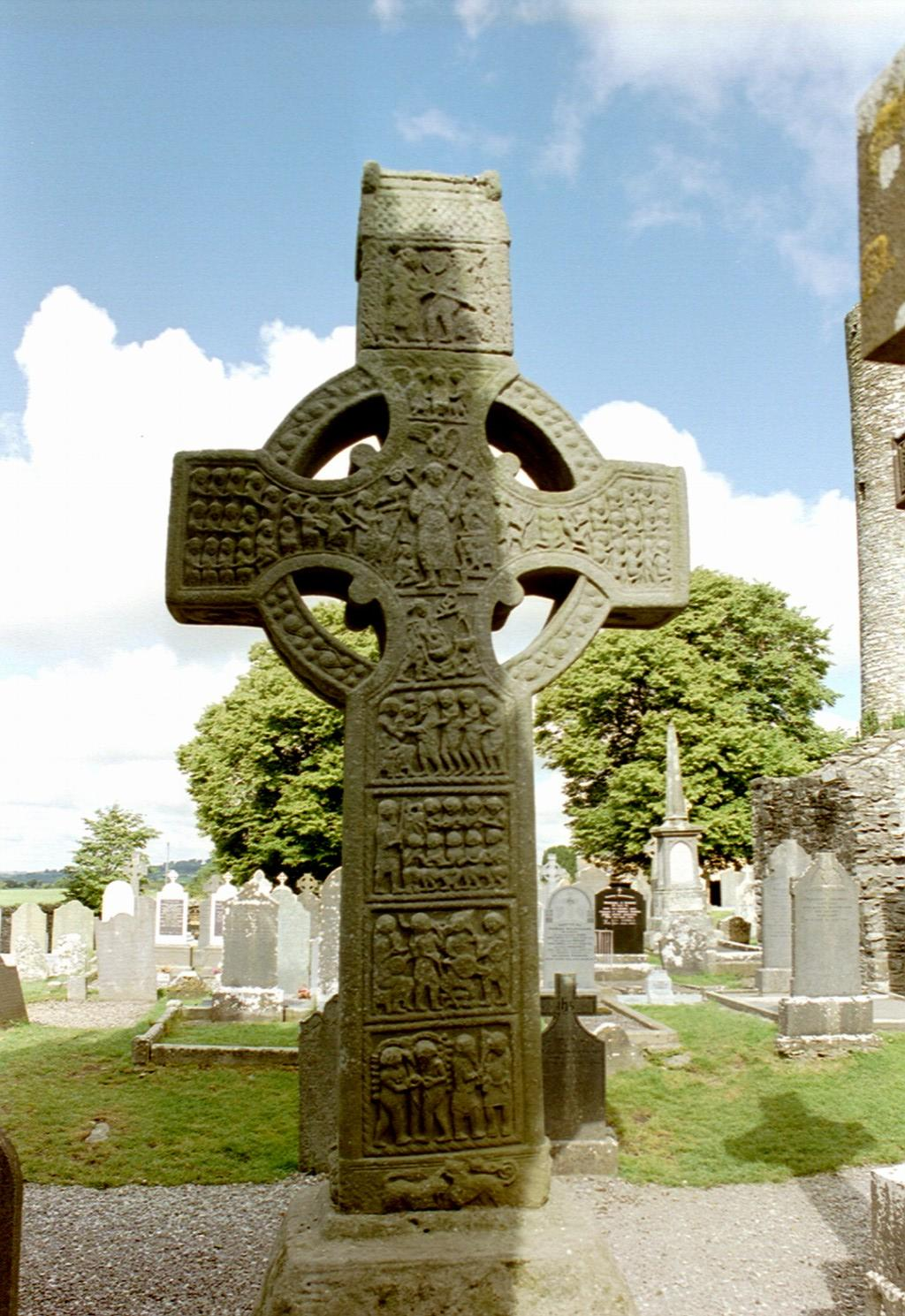
Muiredach's High Cross at Monasterboice, 10th century

Large stone high crosses, usually erected outside monasteries or churches, first appear in the 8th century in Ireland, perhaps at Carndonagh, Donegal, a monastic site with Ionian foundations, apparently later than the earliest Anglo-Saxon crosses, which may be 7th-century.

Later Insular carvings found throughout Britain and Ireland were almost entirely geometrical, as was the decoration on the earliest crosses. By the 9th century figures are carved, and the largest crosses have very many figures in scenes on all surfaces, often from the Old Testament on the east side, and the New on the west, with a Crucifixion at the centre of the cross. The 10th-century Muiredach's High Cross at Monasterboice is usually regarded as the peak of the Irish crosses. In later examples the figures become fewer and larger, and their style begins to merge with the Romanesque, as at the Dysert Cross in Ireland.

The 8th-century Northumbrian Ruthwell Cross, unfortunately damaged by Presbyterian iconoclasm, is the most impressive remaining Anglo-Saxon cross, though as with most Anglo-Saxon crosses the original cross head is missing. Many Anglo-Saxon crosses were much smaller and more slender than the Irish ones, and therefore only had room for carved foliage, but the Bewcastle Cross, Easby Cross and Sandbach Crosses are other survivals with considerable areas of figurative reliefs, with larger-scale figures than any early Irish examples. Even early Anglo-Saxon examples mix vine-scroll decoration of Continental origin with interlace panels, and in later ones the former type becomes the norm, just as in manuscripts. There is literary evidence for considerable numbers of carved stone crosses across the whole of England, and also straight shafts, often as grave-markers, but most survivals are in the northernmost counties. There are remains of other works of monumental sculpture in Anglo-Saxon art, even from the earlier periods, but nothing comparable from Ireland.

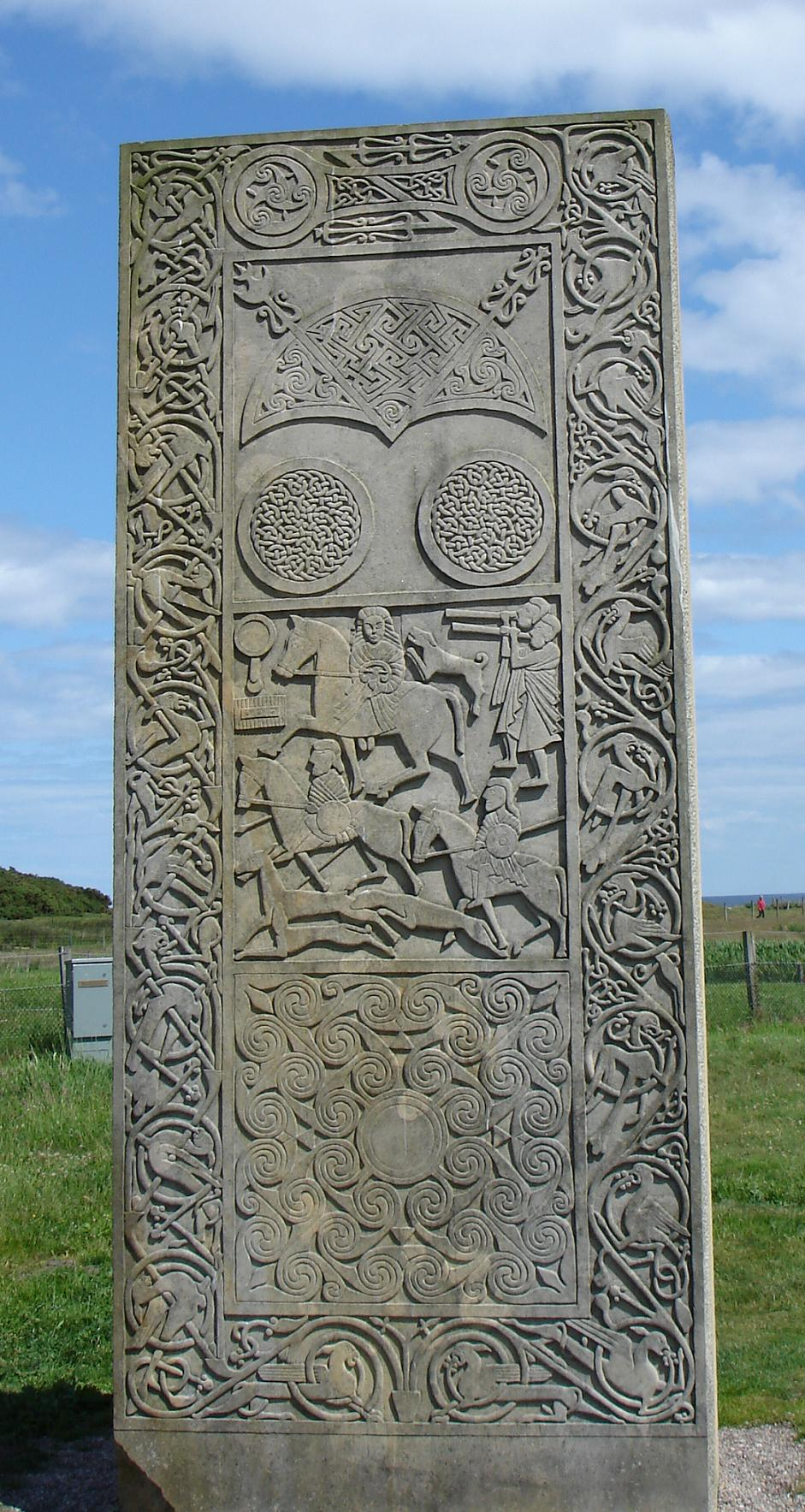
A replica of the Hilton of Cadboll Stone, carved in the Pictish Easter Ross style 800–900 AD

== Pictish standing stones ==
The stone monuments erected by the Picts of Scotland north of the Clyde-Forth line between the 6th–8th centuries are particularly striking in design and construction, carved in the typical Easter Ross style related to that of Insular art, though with much less classical influence. In particular the forms of animals are often closely comparable to those found in Insular manuscripts, where they typically represent the Evangelist's symbols, which may indicate a Pictish origin for these forms, or another common source. The carvings come from both pagan and early Christian periods, and the Pictish symbols, which are still poorly understood, do not seem to have been repugnant to Christians. The purpose and meaning of the stones are only partially understood, although some think that they served as personal memorials, the symbols indicating membership of clans, lineages, or kindreds and depict ancient ceremonies and rituals Examples include the Eassie Stone and the Hilton of Cadboll Stone. It is possible that they had subsidiary uses, such as marking tribal or lineage territories. It has also been suggested that the symbols could have been some kind of pictographic system of writing.

There are also a few examples of similar decoration on Pictish silver jewellery, notably the Norrie's Law Hoard, of the 7th century or perhaps earlier, much of which was melted down on discovery, and the 8th-century St. Ninian's Isle Hoard, with many brooches and bowls. The surviving items from both are now held by the National Museum of Scotland.

== Legacy ==
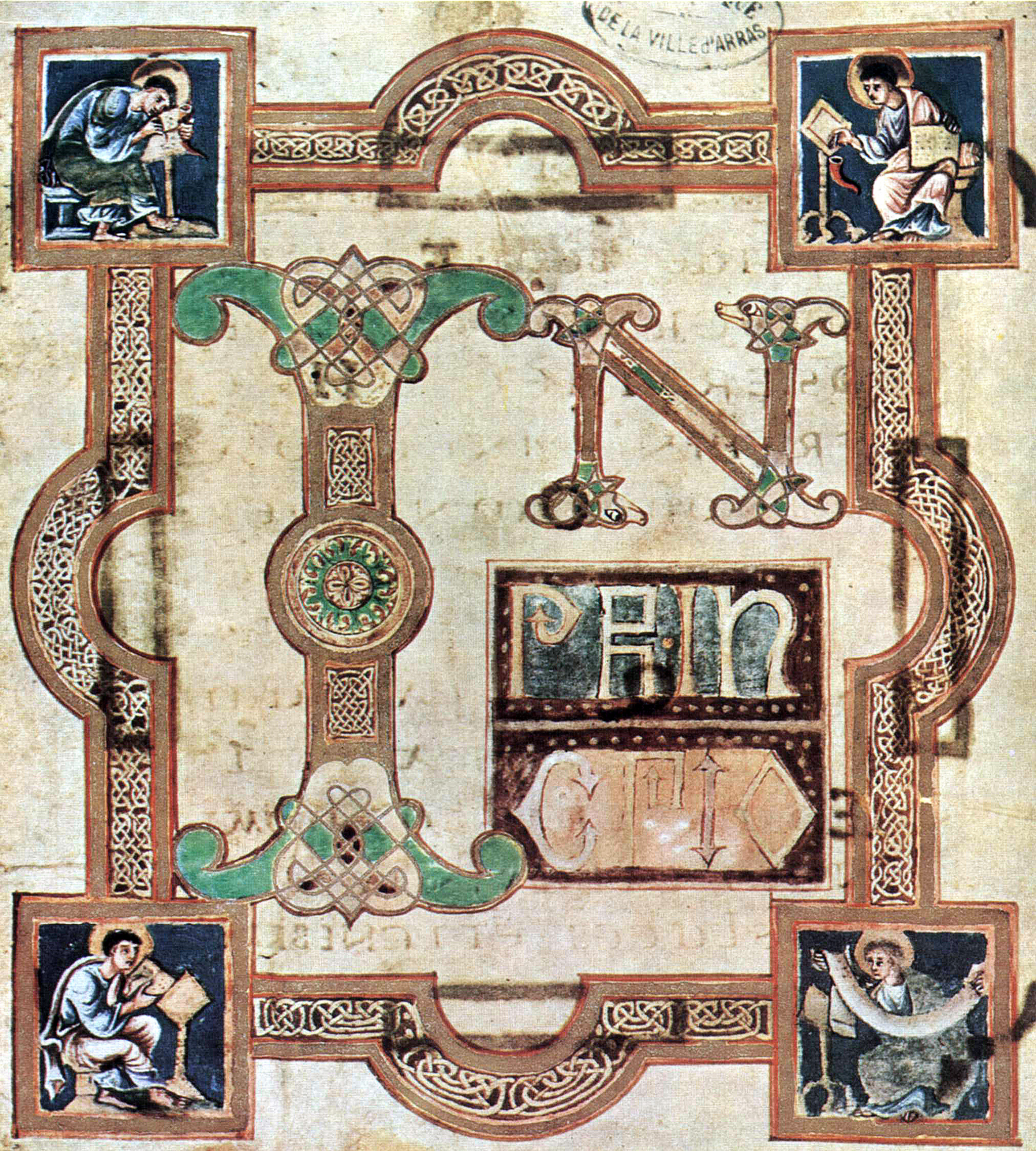
9th-century Carolingian Franco-Saxon Incipit initial combines Insular decoration with classicising Evangelist portraits.

The true legacy of Insular art lies not so much in the specific stylistic features discussed above, but in its fundamental departure from the classical approach to decoration, whether of books or other works of art. The barely controllable energy of Insular decoration, spiralling across formal partitions, becomes a feature of later medieval art, especially Gothic art, in areas where specific Insular motifs are hardly used, such as architecture. The mixing of the figurative with the ornamental also remained characteristic of all later medieval illumination; indeed for the complexity and density of the mixture, Insular manuscripts are only rivalled by some 15th-century works of late Flemish illumination. It is also noticeable that these characteristics are always rather more pronounced in the north of Europe than the south; Italian art, even in the Gothic period, always retains a certain classical clarity in form.

Unmistakable Insular influence can be seen in Carolingian manuscripts, even though these were also trying to copy the Imperial styles of Rome and Byzantium. Greatly enlarged initials, sometimes inhabited, were retained, as well as far more abstract decoration than found in classical models. These features continue in Ottonian and contemporary French illumination and metalwork, before the Romanesque period further removed classical restraints, especially in manuscripts, and the capitals of columns.
