= Garland of Howth =

Ancient Latin Gospels written by Irish monks

Folio 22r, one of two with decorative interlace

The Garland of Howth, also known as the Codex Usserianus Secundus, designated by r^{2} or 28 (in the Beuron system), is a fragmentary 8th to 10th century Latin Gospel Book in the possession of Trinity College Dublin as MS. 56 (A. IV. 6). The Insular manuscript is one of seven in the Library of Trinity College Dublin's collection, related examples including the Book of Kells and the Book of Durrow.

The text, written on vellum, is a version of the old Latin. The manuscript contains the text of the four Gospels with lacunae. It was written at the monastery of Ireland's Eye, Dublin, and once kept in the nearby parish church of Howth. Only 86 folios have survived; for example only 5:12-10:3 of the Gospel of John have survived. It is written with "diminuendo" script from initials, a feature of the oldest manuscripts in insular script such as Cathach of St. Columba. It has been described as the work of many scribes, none of them first-class.

The Garland of Howth is approximately 241 mm × 192 mm (9.5 in × 7.6 in). The manuscript is in fragmented condition, with two remaining illuminated pages decorated with interlace.

The text of the codex is mixed. The text of Matthew is Old Latin, similar to that in Codex Usserianus I. The text of Mark, Luke, and John is very near to the Vulgate.

"Vetus Latina" means the text is a Latin version predating the Vulgate - such versions were used in Ireland later than in most areas. The "garland" of its title is taken from a corrupted English form of Ceithre Leabhair, Irish for 'four books', i.e., a gospel. Abbott made a collation. The manuscript was examined and edited by Lawlor, Hoskier, and Jülicher.

== See also ==
- List of New Testament Latin manuscripts
- Book of Dimma
- Book of Mulling
- Book of Kells
- Book of Armaugh
- Würzburg Universitätsbibliothek Cod. M. p. th. f. 67
