= Bobbio Orosius =

7th century Insular manuscript

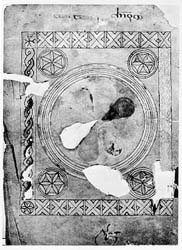
Folio 1v of the Bobbio Orosius contains the oldest surviving carpet page in any insular manuscript.

The Bobbio Orosius (Milan, Biblioteca Ambrosiana MS D. 23. Sup.) is an early 7th century Insular manuscript of the Chronicon of Paulus Orosius. The manuscript has 48 folios and measures 210 by 150 mm. It is thought to have been produced at the scriptorium of Bobbio Abbey, which was founded by Saint Columbanus in 612. It appears in an inventory of the monastic library done in 1461. The monks gave the manuscript to the Ambrosian Library when it was founded in 1606 by Cardinal Federico Borromeo.

== Contents ==
=== Carpet page ===
It contains the earliest surviving carpet page in Insular art. The carpet page is on folio 1v. Although it is simpler in design than later carpet pages and contains motifs not found in later carpet pages, it shows a subtlety of pattern and alternation of colors common to Insular manuscripts. It consists of a large central rosette surrounded by four corner rosettes, all contained within a rectangular frame. The vertical panels of the frame contain cable motifs; the frame on the left has a single larger cable of white on pink, while the frame on the right has two smaller cables of white on pink separated by a yellow bar. The upper and lower panels are broken into smaller square panels separated by thin bars. The smaller panels are composed of chevrons and triangles that alternate in pink and yellow. The side top and bottom panels continue to the right edge of the frame. Above the left vertical frame there are two square frames containing circular motifs; the top with a cross inside a circle, and the bottom with a rosette. The cross within the circle in the top panel is similar to the cross within a circle found in the center of the carpet page on folio 192v of the Book of Durrow. Six concentric circles surround the central rosette. The page is faded and damaged so that it is difficult to be certain of its original appearance. It has been suggested that the carpet page is later addition to the manuscript.

The carpet page faces the first page of text in the manuscript. The initial P and the opening words Praeceptis tuis par(rui) are many times larger than the rest of the text and are of hollow shafted capitals, with stem of the P descending the entire length of the text block. The capitals are filled with pink and orange pigment. There is an initial D on folio 5 which is outlined by dots and is filled with orange. There is also a larger initial N on folio 33 that has a cable pattern in white on orange in the uprights. The crossing bar is green, while orange dots fill the background.

== See also ==
- Bobbio Jerome
