= Bobbio Jerome =

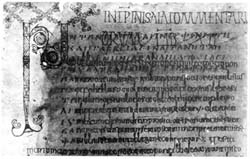
The initial INI monogram from the Bobbio Jerome

The Bobbio Jerome (Milan, Biblioteca Ambrosiana MS S. 45. sup.) is an early seventh-century manuscript copy of the Commentary on Isaiah attributed to St. Jerome. The manuscript has 156 pages and measures 235 by 215 mm. It is a palimpsest that previously contained a sixth-century copy of the Gothic translation of the Bible by Ulfilas written in Gothic uncial, with Rustic capitals as a display script.

The illumination of the manuscript consists of a large initial N on page two of the manuscript and several other minor initials. The N is as large as nine lines of the main text. It is written in black ink and decorated by whorl and cross patterns and pelta motifs. There are touches of green and orange. The cross bar is formed, in part, by two fish bent to form an S curve. The form of the N is comparable to the initial INI monogram of the opening illumination of the Gospel of Mark found in a fragmentary Gospel Book from Durham Cathedral.

On page two there is an inscription connecting the manuscript to Atalanus, who was St. Columbanus's successor as abbot of the monastery at Bobbio. Atalanus died in 622. If this inscription is accepted as authentic, then this manuscript was produced before 622, making its initial N one of the earliest Insular style initials, preceding even the Cathach of St. Columba.

This initial can be compared with the few decorated ones in Gregory the Great, Pastoral Care (Troyes, Bibliothèque Municipale, MS 504), from Rome, and about twenty years older.
