= Durham Gospel Fragment =

Durham Gospel Fragment may refer to any of three manuscripts now housed in the library at Durham Cathedral.

- Gospel Book Fragment (Durham Cathedral Library, A. II. 10.)
- Gospel Book Fragment (Durham Cathedral Library, A. II. 16.)
- The Durham Gospels (MS A. II. 17)
