= Howl =

Howl most often refers to:

- Howling, an animal vocalization in many canine species
- "Howl" (poem), a 1956 poem by Allen Ginsberg

Howl or The Howl may also refer to:

== Film ==
- The Howl, a 1970 Italian film
- Howl (2010 film), a 2010 American arthouse biopic film
- Howl (2015 film), a 2015 independent British horror film
- Howl (2025 film), a 2025 short Australian film

== Literature ==
- Howl (magazine), published by the Hunt Saboteurs Association in Britain
- Howl and Other Poems, the collection of poetry containing "Howl"
- Wizard Howl, fictional character in the 1986 novel Howl's Moving Castle by Diana Wynne Jones

== Music ==
=== Albums and EPs ===
- Howl (Black Rebel Motorcycle Club album), 2005
- Howl (Rival Consoles album), 2015
- Howl (Howl EP), 2008
- Howl (Chuu EP), 2023
- Howl, a 2012 EP by Beware of Darkness

=== Songs ===
- "Howl" (song), a 2013 song by Beware of Darkness
- "Howl", 2009 song by Florence and the Machine from the album Lungs
- "Howl", a track from The Gaslight Anthem's 2012 album, Handwritten
- "Howl", 2016 song by Biffy Clyro from the album Ellipsis
- "Howl", song by Blood Red Shoes from the 2019 album Get Tragic

=== Bands ===
- Howl (American band), American metal band
- Howl (Norwegian band), Norwegian rock band
- Howl, former name of Australian punk band Hunting Grounds

== Other uses ==
- Howl (podcast app), a former podcast hosting app related to Earwolf
- Howl (video game), a 2023 puzzle game
- Howl Festival, an arts history festival held annually in New York, 2003–2013

== See also ==
- Howling (disambiguation)
