= Book of Kells =

Illuminated 9th-century Gospel book

The Book of Kells
- Codex Cenannensis; Leabhar Cheanannais
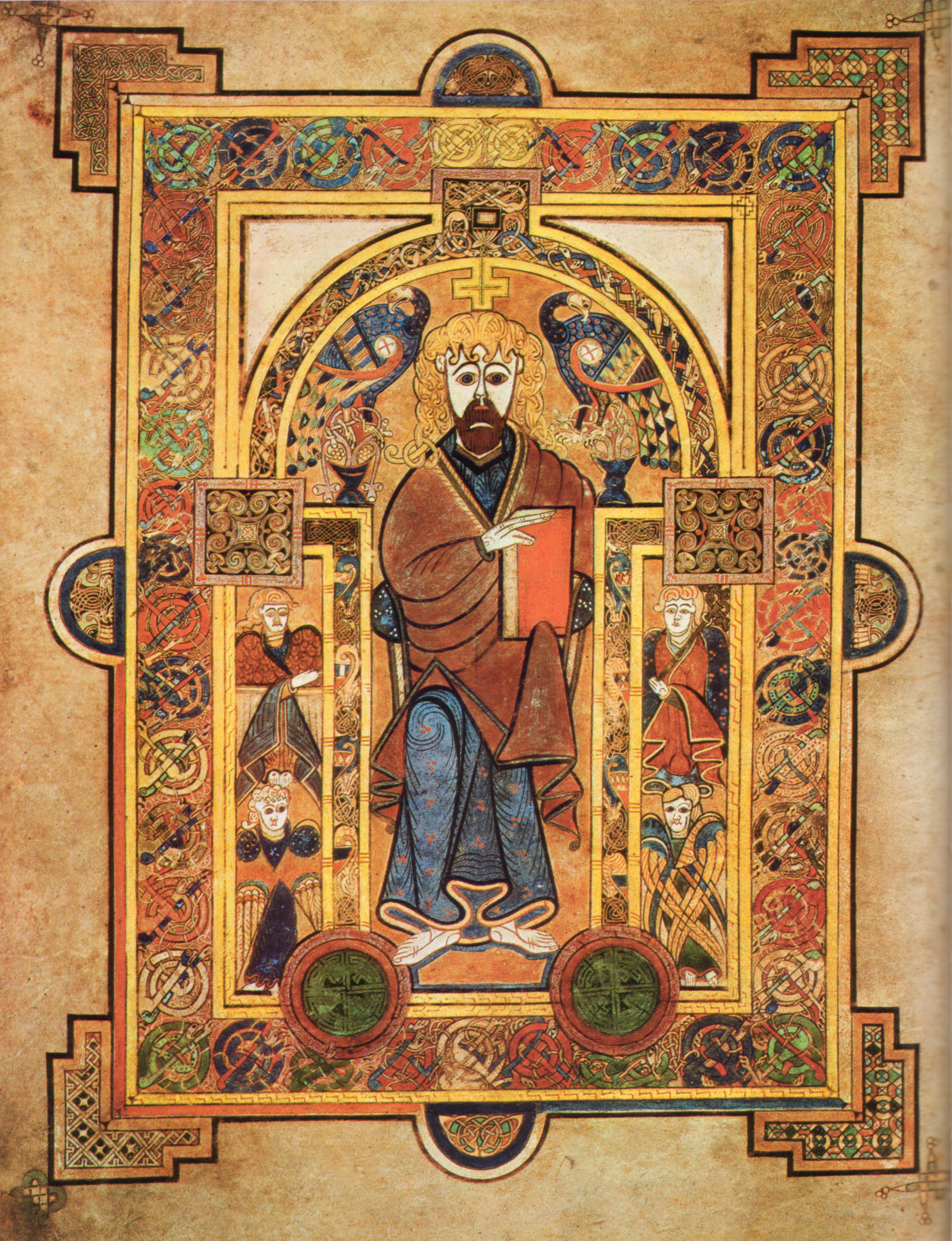
- Christ enthroned.
- Also known as: Book of Columba
- Language: Latin
- Date: 9th century
- Provenance: Columban monasteries in Ireland, Scotland and England
- Manuscript(s): TCD MS 58
- Genre: Gospel Book
- Length: 340 folios, 680 pages
- Sources: Vulgate, Vetus Latina

The Book of Kells (Latin: Codex Cenannensis; Irish: Leabhar Cheanannais; Library of Trinity College Dublin, MS A. I. [58], sometimes known as the Book of Columba) is an illustrated manuscript and Celtic Gospel book in Latin, containing the four Gospels of the New Testament together with various prefatory texts and tables. It was created in a Columban monastery in Ireland or Scotland, and may have had contributions from various Columban institutions across Ireland and Scotland. It is believed to have been created c. 800 AD. The text of the Gospels is largely drawn from the Vulgate, although it also includes several passages drawn from the earlier versions of the Bible known as the Vetus Latina. It is regarded as a masterwork of Western calligraphy and the pinnacle of Insular illumination. The manuscript is named after Abbey of Kells, County Meath, which was its home for centuries.

The illustrations and ornamentation of the Book of Kells surpass those of other Insular Gospel books in extravagance and complexity. The decoration combines traditional Christian iconography with the ornate swirling motifs typical of Insular art. Figures of humans, animals and mythical beasts, together with Celtic knots and interlacing patterns in vibrant colours, enliven the manuscript's pages. Many of these minor decorative elements are imbued with Christian symbolism, and so further emphasise the themes of the major illustrations.

The manuscript today comprises 340 leaves or folios; the recto and verso of each leaf total 680 pages. Since 1953, it has been bound in four volumes, 330 by 250 mm (13 by 9.8 in). The leaves are high-quality calf vellum; the unprecedentedly elaborate ornamentation that covers them includes ten full-page illustrations and text pages that are vibrant with decorated initials and interlinear miniatures, marking the furthest extension of the anti-classical and energetic qualities of Insular art. The Insular majuscule script of the text appears to be the work of at least three different scribes. The lettering is in iron gall ink, and the colours used were derived from a wide range of substances, some of which were imported from distant lands.

The manuscript is on display to visitors in Trinity College Library, Dublin, and shows two pages at any one time, rotated every 6-8 weeks. A digitised version of the entire manuscript may also be seen online.

== History ==
=== Origin ===
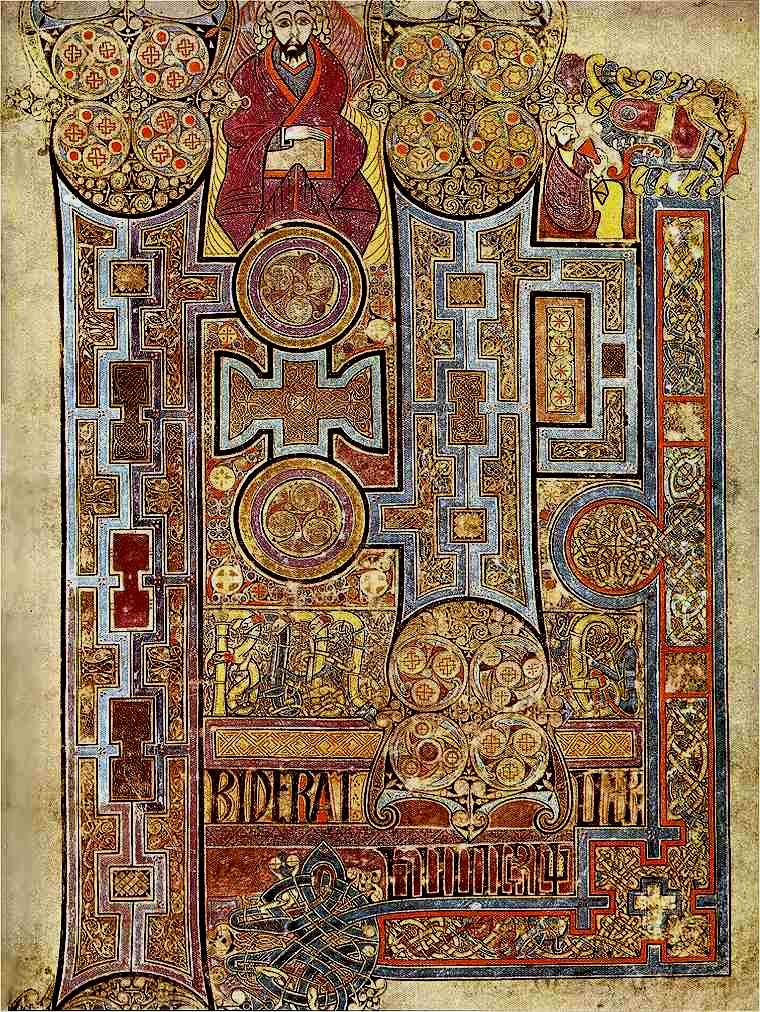
The Book of Kells, (folio 292r), circa 800, showing the lavishly decorated text that opens the Gospel of John

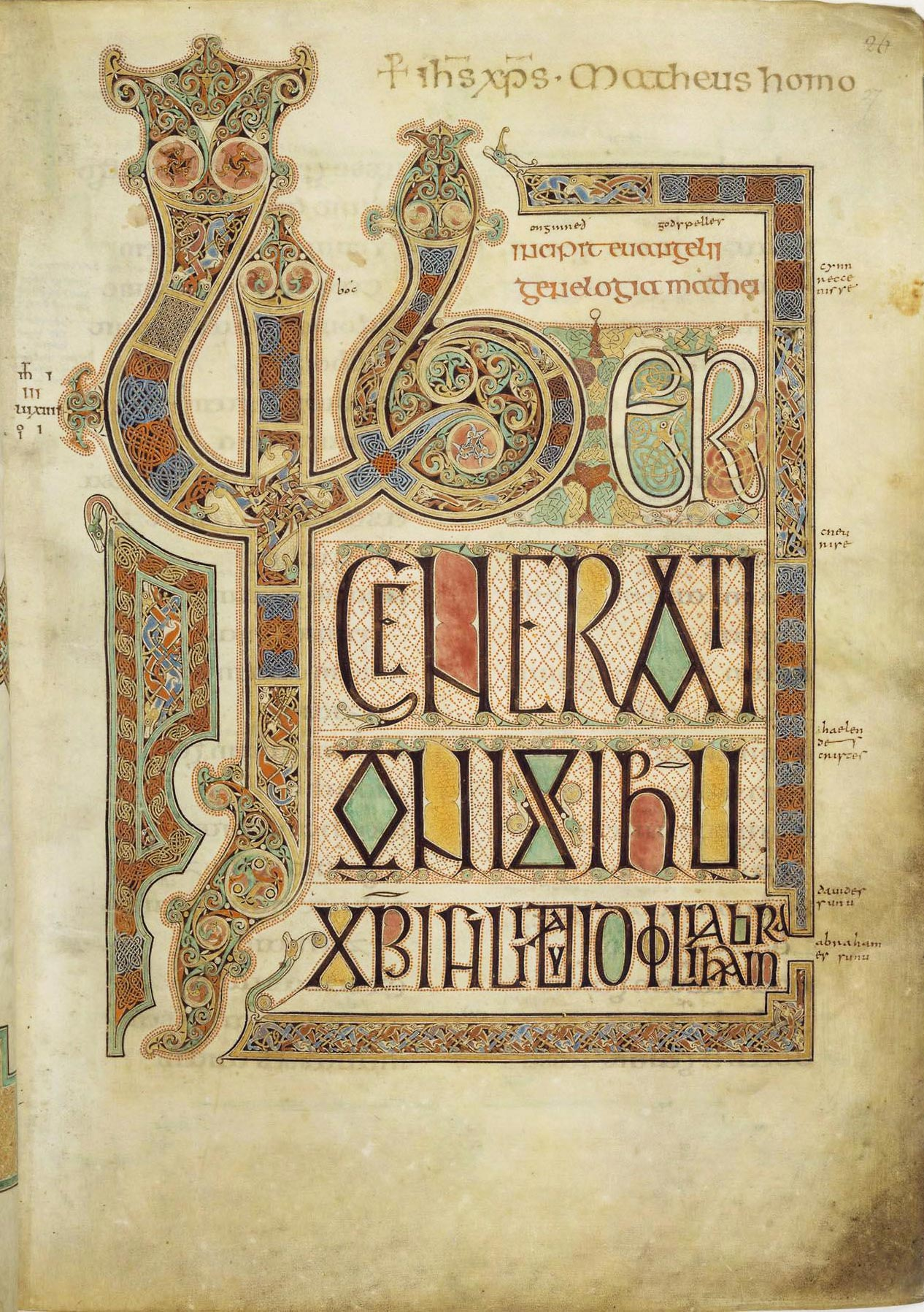
Folio 27r from the Lindisfarne Gospels contains the incipit Liber generationis of the Gospel of Matthew. Compare this page with the corresponding page from the Book of Kells (see here), especially the form of the Lib monogram.

The Book of Kells is one of the finest and most famous, and also one of the latest, of a group of manuscripts in what is known as the Insular style, produced from the late 6th through the early 9th centuries in monasteries in Britain and Ireland and in continental monasteries with Hiberno-Scottish or Anglo-Saxon foundations. These manuscripts include the Cathach of St. Columba, the Ambrosiana Orosius, fragmentary Gospel in the Durham Dean and Chapter Library (all from the early 7th century), and the Book of Durrow (from the second half of the 7th century). From the early 8th century come the Durham Gospels, the Echternach Gospels, the Lindisfarne Gospels, and the Lichfield Gospels. Among others, the St. Gall Gospel Book belongs to the late 8th century and the Book of Armagh (dated to 807–809) to the early 9th century.

Scholars place these manuscripts together based on similarities in artistic style, script, and textual traditions. The fully developed style of the ornamentation of the Book of Kells places it late in this series, either from the late 8th or early 9th century. The Book of Kells follows many of the iconographic and stylistic traditions found in these earlier manuscripts. For example, the form of the decorated letters found in the incipit pages for the Gospels is surprisingly consistent in Insular Gospels. Compare, for example, the incipit pages of the Gospel of Matthew in the Lindisfarne Gospels and in the Book of Kells, both of which feature intricate decorative knotwork patterns inside the outlines formed by the enlarged initial letters of the text. (For a more complete list of related manuscripts, see: List of Hiberno-Saxon illustrated manuscripts).

The Abbey of Kells in Kells, County Meath, had been founded, or refounded, from Iona Abbey, construction taking from 807 until the consecration of the church in 814. The manuscript's date and place of production have been subjects of considerable debate. Traditionally, the book was thought to have been created in the time of Columba, possibly even as the work of his own hands. This tradition has long been discredited on palaeographic and stylistic grounds: most evidence points to a composition date c. 800, long after St. Columba's death in 597. The proposed dating in the 9th century coincides with Viking raids on Lindisfarne and Iona, which began c. 793-794 and eventually dispersed the monks and their holy relics into Ireland and Scotland. There is another tradition, with some traction among Irish scholars, that suggests the manuscript was created for the 200th anniversary of the saint's death. Alternatively, as is thought possible for the Northumbrian Lindisfarne Gospels and also the St Cuthbert Gospel, both with Saint Cuthbert, it may have been produced to mark the "translation" or moving of Columba's remains into a shrine reliquary, which probably had taken place by the 750s.

There are at least four competing theories about the manuscript's place of origin and time of completion. First, the book, or perhaps just the text, may have been created at Iona and then completed in Kells. Second, the book may have been produced entirely at Iona. Third, the manuscript may have been produced entirely in the scriptorium at Kells. Finally, it may have been the product of Dunkeld or another monastery in Pictish Scotland, though there is no actual evidence for this theory, especially considering the absence of any surviving manuscript from Pictland. Although the question of the exact location of the book's production will probably never be answered conclusively, the first theory, that it was begun at Iona and continued at Kells, is widely accepted. Regardless of which theory is true, it is certain that the Book of Kells was produced by Columban monks closely associated with the community at Iona.

The historical circumstances which informed the Book of Kells' production were the preservation of the Latin language after the fall of the Western Roman Empire and the establishment of monastic life which entailed the production of texts. Cassiodorus in particular advocated both practices, having founded the monastery Vivarium in the sixth century and having written Institutiones, a work which describes and recommends several texts—both religious and secular—for study by monks. Vivarium included a scriptorium for the reproduction of books in both genres. Later, the Carolingian period introduced the innovation of copying texts onto vellum, a material much more durable than the papyrus to which many ancient writings had been committed. Gradually, these traditions spread throughout the European continent and finally to the British Isles.

=== Medieval period ===
Kells Abbey was pillaged by Vikings many times at the beginning of the 9th century, and how the book survived is not known. The earliest historical reference to the book, and indeed to the book's presence at Kells, can be found in a 1007 entry in the Annals of Ulster. This entry records that "the great Gospel of Columkille [Columba], the chief relic of the Western World, was wickedly stolen during the night from the western sacristy of the great stone church at Cenannas on account of its wrought shrine". The manuscript was recovered a few months later—minus its golden and bejewelled cover—"under a sod". It is generally assumed that the "great Gospel of Columkille" is the Book of Kells. If this is correct, then the book was in Kells by 1007 and had been there long enough for thieves to learn of its presence. The force of ripping the manuscript free from its cover may account for the folios missing from the beginning and end of the Book of Kells. The description in the Annals of the book as "of Columkille"—that is, having belonged to, and perhaps being made by Columba—suggests that the book was believed at that time to have been made on Iona.

Regardless, the book was certainly at Kells in the 12th century, when land charters pertaining to the Abbey of Kells were copied onto some of its blank pages. The practice of copying charters into important books was widespread in the medieval period, and such inscriptions in the Book of Kells provide concrete evidence about its location at the time.

The Abbey of Kells was dissolved because of the ecclesiastical reforms of the 12th century. The abbey church was converted to a parish church in which the Book of Kells remained.

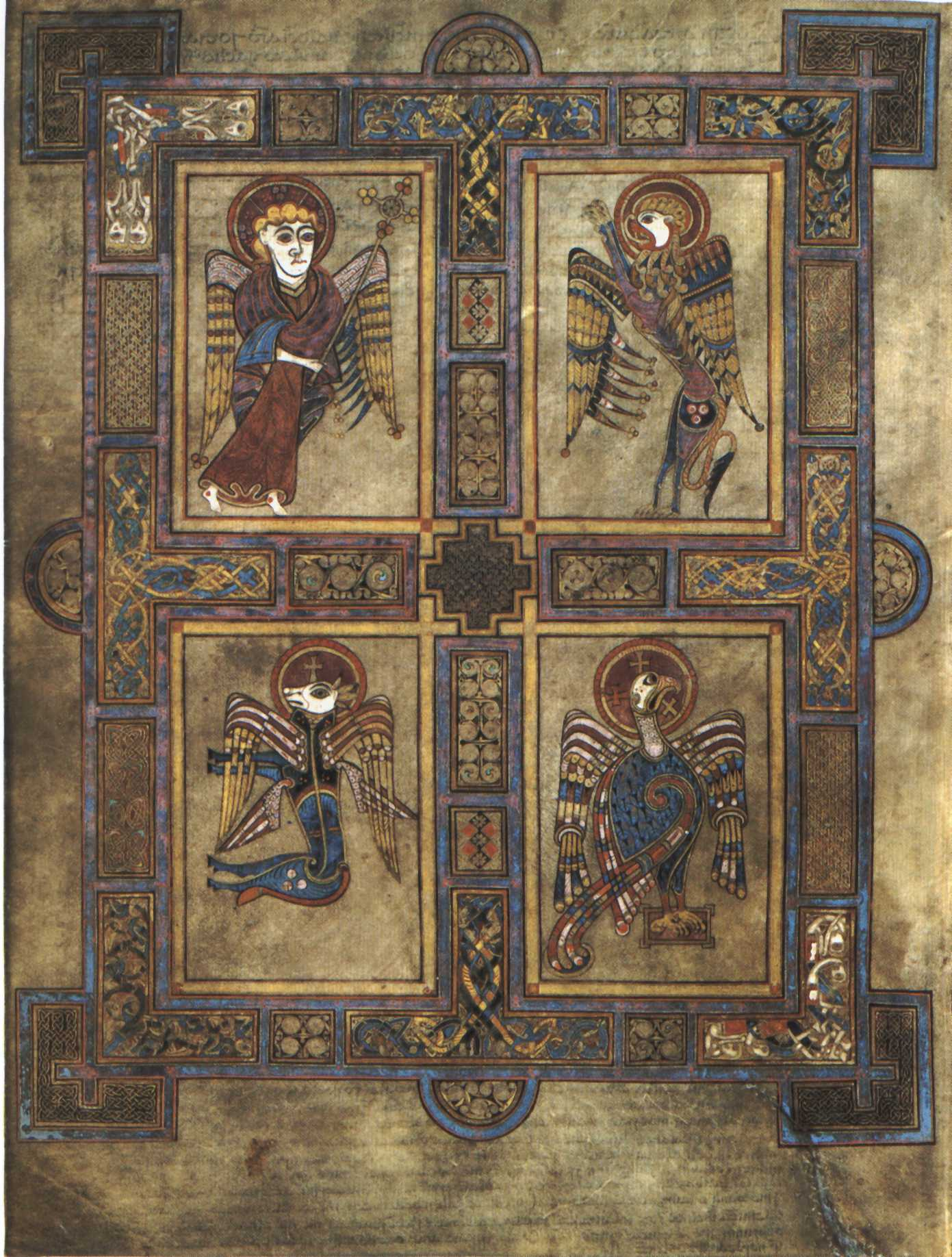
Folio 27v contains the symbols of the Four Evangelists (clockwise from top left): an angel (Matthew), a lion (Mark), an eagle (John) and an ox (Luke)

==== Book of Kildare ====
The 12th-century writer Gerald of Wales, in his Topographia Hibernica, described seeing a great Gospel Book in Kildare which many have since assumed was the Book of Kells. The description certainly matches Kells:

This book contains the harmony of the Four Evangelists according to Jerome, where for almost every page there are different designs... and other forms almost infinite... Fine craftsmanship is all about you, but you might not notice it. Look more keenly at it and you will penetrate to the very shrine of art. You will make out intricacies, so delicate and subtle, so exact and compact, so full of knots and links, with colours so fresh and vivid, that you might say that all this was the work of an angel, and not of a man.

Since Gerald claims to have seen this book in Kildare, he may have seen another, now lost, book equal in quality to the Book of Kells, or he may have misstated his location.

=== Modern period ===
The Book of Kells remained in Kells until 1654. In that year, Cromwell's cavalry was quartered in the church at Kells, and the governor of the town sent the book to Dublin for safekeeping. Henry Jones, then Bishop of Clogher and Vice-Chancellor of the University of Dublin, presented the manuscript to Trinity College in Dublin in 1661, and it has remained there ever since, except for brief loans to other libraries and museums. It has been on display to the public in the Old Library at Trinity since the 19th century.

The manuscript's rise to worldwide fame began in the 19th century. The association with St. Columba, who died the same year Augustine brought Christianity and literacy to Canterbury from Rome, was used to demonstrate Ireland's cultural primacy, seemingly providing "irrefutable precedence in the debate on the relative authority of the Irish and Roman churches". Queen Victoria and Prince Albert were invited to sign the book in 1849. The book's artistry was influential on the Celtic Revival; several Victorian picture books of medieval illuminations featured designs from the book which were in turn extensively copied and adapted, patterns appearing in metalwork, embroidery, furniture and pottery among other crafts.

Over the centuries, the book has been rebound several times. During a 19th-century rebinding, the pages were badly cropped, with small parts of some illustrations being lost. The book was also rebound in 1895, but that rebinding broke down quickly. By the late 1920s, several folios had detached completely and were kept separate from the main volume. In 1953, bookbinder Roger Powell rebound the manuscript in four volumes and stretched several pages that had developed bulges. One volume is always on display at Trinity, opened at either a major decorated page or a text page with smaller decorations.

In 2000, the volume containing the Gospel of Mark was sent to Canberra, Australia, for an exhibition of illuminated manuscripts. This was only the fourth time the Book of Kells had been sent abroad for exhibition. The volume suffered what has been called "minor pigment damage" while en route to Canberra. It is thought that the vibrations from the aeroplane's engines during the long flight may have caused the damage.

== Description ==
Summary Contents of the Book of Kells
Section	Folios	Pages
Preliminaries	Folio 1r — 27r	53
Matthew	Folio 27v — 36v 36*r — 36*v 37r — 129r	206
Mark	Folio 129v — 187v	117
Luke	Folio 188r — 290r	205
John (through 17:13)	Folio 290v — 339v	99

The Book of Kells contains the four Gospels of the Christian scriptures written in black, red, purple, and yellow ink in an insular majuscule script, preceded by prefaces, summaries, and concordances of Gospel passages. Today, it consists of 340 vellum leaves, or folios, totalling 680 pages. Almost all folios are numbered at recto, bottom left. One folio number, 36, was mistakenly double-counted. As a result, the pagination of the entire book is reckoned thus: folio 1r — 36v, 36*r — 36*v (the double-counted folio), and 37r — 339v. The majority of the folios are part of larger sheets, called bifolia, which are folded in half to form two folios. The bifolia are nested inside of each other and sewn together to form gatherings called quires. On occasion, a folio is not part of a bifolium but is instead a single sheet inserted within a quire. The extant folios are gathered into 38 quires. There are between four and twelve folios (two to six bifolia) per quire; the folios are commonly, but not invariably, bound in groups of ten. Some folios are single sheets, as is frequently the case with the important decorated pages. The folios had lines drawn for the text, sometimes on both sides, after the bifolia were folded. Prick marks and guidelines can still be seen on some pages. The vellum is of high quality, although the folios have an uneven thickness, with some being close to leather while others are so thin as to be almost translucent. As many as twelve individuals may have collaborated on the book's production, of whom four scribes and three painters have been distinguished.

The book's current dimensions are 330 by 250 mm. Originally, the folios were of no standard size, but they were cropped to the current size during a 19th-century rebinding. The text area is approximately 250 by 170 mm. Each text page has 16 to 18 lines of text. The manuscript is in remarkably good condition considering its age, though many pages have suffered some damage to the delicate artwork due to rubbing. The book must have been the product of a major scriptorium over several years, yet was apparently never finished, the projected decoration of some pages appearing only in outline. It is believed that the original manuscript consisted of about 370 folios, based on gaps in the text and the absence of key illustrations. The bulk of the missing material (or, about 30 folios) was perhaps lost when the book was stolen in the early 11th century. In 1621 the prominent Anglican clergyman James Ussher counted just 344 folios; presently another four or five are missing from the body of the text, after folios 177, 239, and 330. The missing bifolium 335-36 was found and restored in 1741.

=== Contents ===
The extant book contains preliminary matter, the complete text of the Gospels of Matthew, Mark and Luke, and the Gospel of John through John 17:13. The remaining preliminary matter consists of two fragmentary lists of Hebrew names contained in the Gospels, Breves causae (Gospel summaries), Argumenta (short biographies of the Evangelists), and Eusebian canon tables. It is probable that, like the Lindisfarne Gospels and the Books of Durrow and Armagh, part of the lost preliminary material included the letter of Jerome to Pope Damasus I beginning Novum opus, in which Jerome explains the purpose of his translation. It is also possible, though less likely, that the lost material included the letter of Eusebius to Carpianus, in which he explains the use of the canon tables. Of all the insular Gospels, only the Lindisfarne manuscript contains this letter.

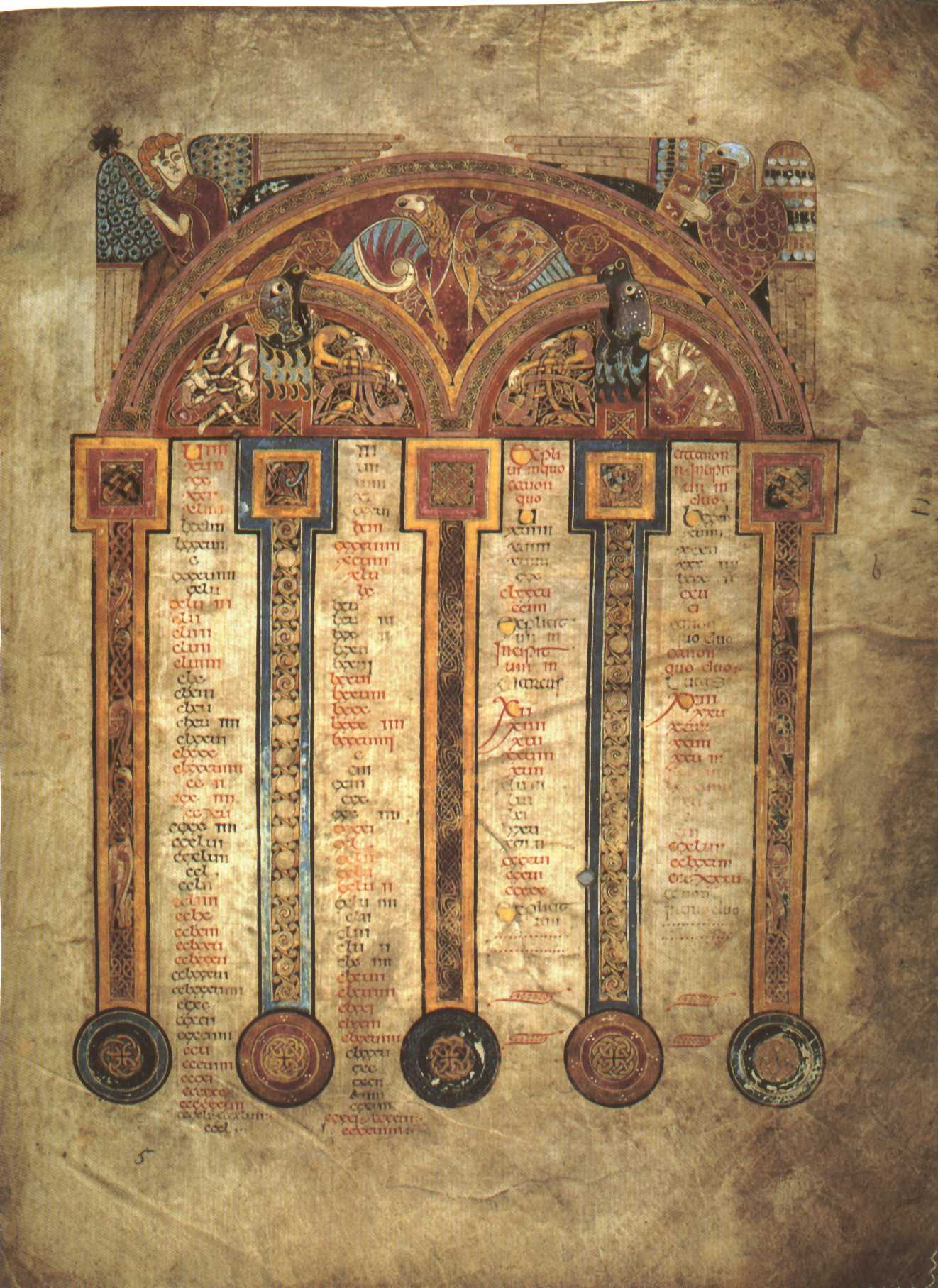
Folio 5r contains a page of the Eusebian Canons.

There are two fragments of the lists of Hebrew names; one on the recto of the first surviving folio and one on folio 26, which is currently inserted at the end of the prefatory matter for John. The first list fragment contains the end of the list for the Gospel of Matthew. The missing names from Matthew would require an additional two folios. The second list fragment, on folio 26, contains about a fourth of the list for Luke. The list for Luke would require an additional three folios. The structure of the quire in which folio 26 occurs is such that it is unlikely that there are three folios missing between folios 26 and 27, so that it is almost certain that folio 26 is not now in its original location. There is no trace of the lists for Mark and John.

The first list fragment is followed by the canon tables of Eusebius of Caesarea. These tables, which predate the text of the Vulgate, were developed to cross-reference the Gospels. Eusebius divided the Gospel into chapters and then created tables that allowed readers to find where a given episode in the life of Christ was located in each of the Gospels. The canon tables were traditionally included in the prefatory material in most medieval copies of the Vulgate text of the Gospels. The tables in the Book of Kells are however unusable, first because the scribe condensed the tables in such a way as to make them confused. Second and more importantly, the corresponding chapter numbers were never inserted into the margins of the text, making it impossible to find the sections to which the canon tables refer. The reason for the omission remains unclear: the scribe may have planned to add the references upon the manuscript's completion, or he may have deliberately left them out so as not to spoil the appearance of pages.

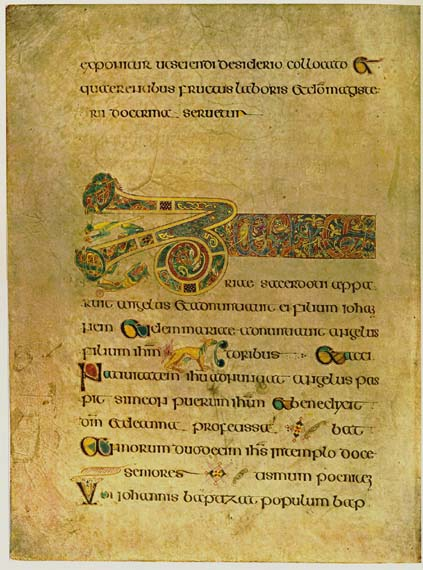
Folio 19v contains the beginning of the Breves causae of Luke.

The Breves causae and Argumenta belong to a pre-Vulgate tradition of manuscripts. The Breves causae are summaries of the Old Latin translations of the Gospels and are divided into numbered chapters. These chapter numbers, like the numbers for the canon tables, are not used on the text pages of the Gospels. It is unlikely that these numbers would have been used, even if the manuscript had been completed, because the chapter numbers corresponded to old Latin translations and would have been difficult to harmonise with the Vulgate text. The Argumenta are collections of legends about the Evangelists. The Breves causae and Argumenta are arranged in a strange order: first, come the Breves causae and Argumenta for Matthew, followed by the Breves and Argumenta for Mark, then, quite oddly, come the Argumenta of both Luke and John, followed by their Breves causae. This anomalous order mirrors that found in the Book of Durrow, although in the latter instance, the misplaced sections appear at the very end of the manuscript rather than as part of a continuous preliminary. In other insular manuscripts, such as the Lindisfarne Gospels, the Book of Armagh, and the Echternach Gospels, each Gospel is treated as a separate work and has its preliminaries immediately preceding it. The slavish repetition in Kells of the order of the Breves causae and Argumenta found in Durrow led scholar T. K. Abbott to conclude that the scribes of Kells had either the Book of Durrow or a common model in hand.

=== Text and script ===
The Book of Kells contains the text of the four Gospels based on the Vulgate. It does not, however, contain a pure copy of the Vulgate. There are numerous differences from the Vulgate, where Old Latin translations are used in lieu of Jerome's text. Although such variants are common in all the insular Gospels, there does not seem to be a consistent pattern of variation amongst the various insular texts. Evidence suggests that when the scribes were writing the text they often depended on memory rather than on their exemplar.

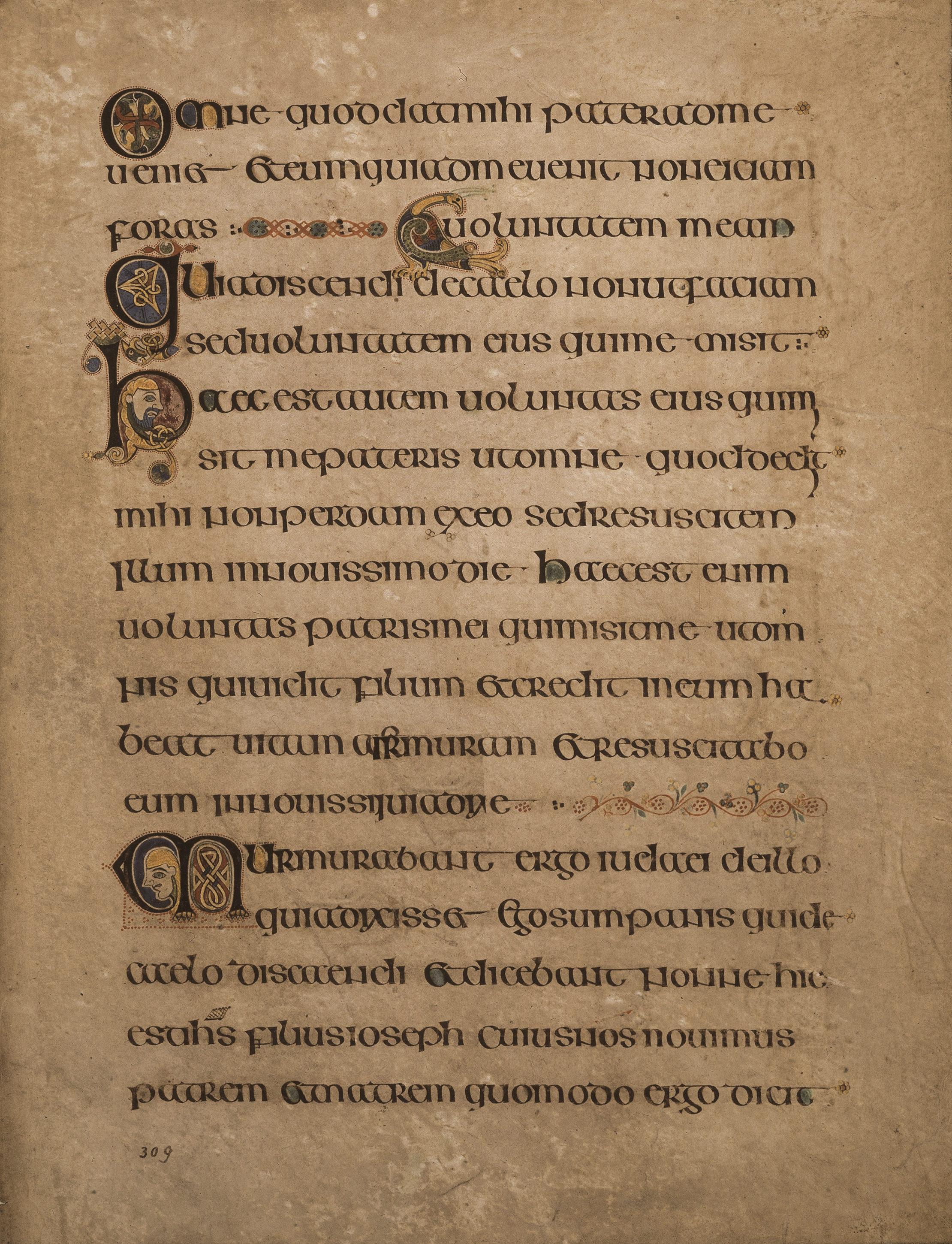
Folio 309r contains text from the Gospel of John written in Insular majuscule by the scribe known as Hand B.

The manuscript is written primarily in insular majuscule with some occurrences of minuscule letters (usually e or s). The text is usually written in one long line across the page. Françoise Henry identified at least three scribes in the manuscript, whom she named Hand A, Hand B, and Hand C. Hand A is found on folios 1 through 19v, folios 276 through 289, and folios 307 through the end of the manuscript. Hand A, for the most part, writes eighteen or nineteen lines per page in the brown gall ink common throughout the West. Hand B is found on folios 19r through 26 and folios 124 through 128. Hand B has a somewhat greater tendency to use minuscule and uses red, purple and black ink and a variable number of lines per page. Hand C is found throughout the majority of the text. Hand C also has a greater tendency to use minuscule than Hand A. Hand C uses the same brownish gall ink used by hand A and wrote, almost always, seventeen lines per page. Additionally a fourth scribe named Hand D has been hypothesized, to whom folio 104r was attributed.

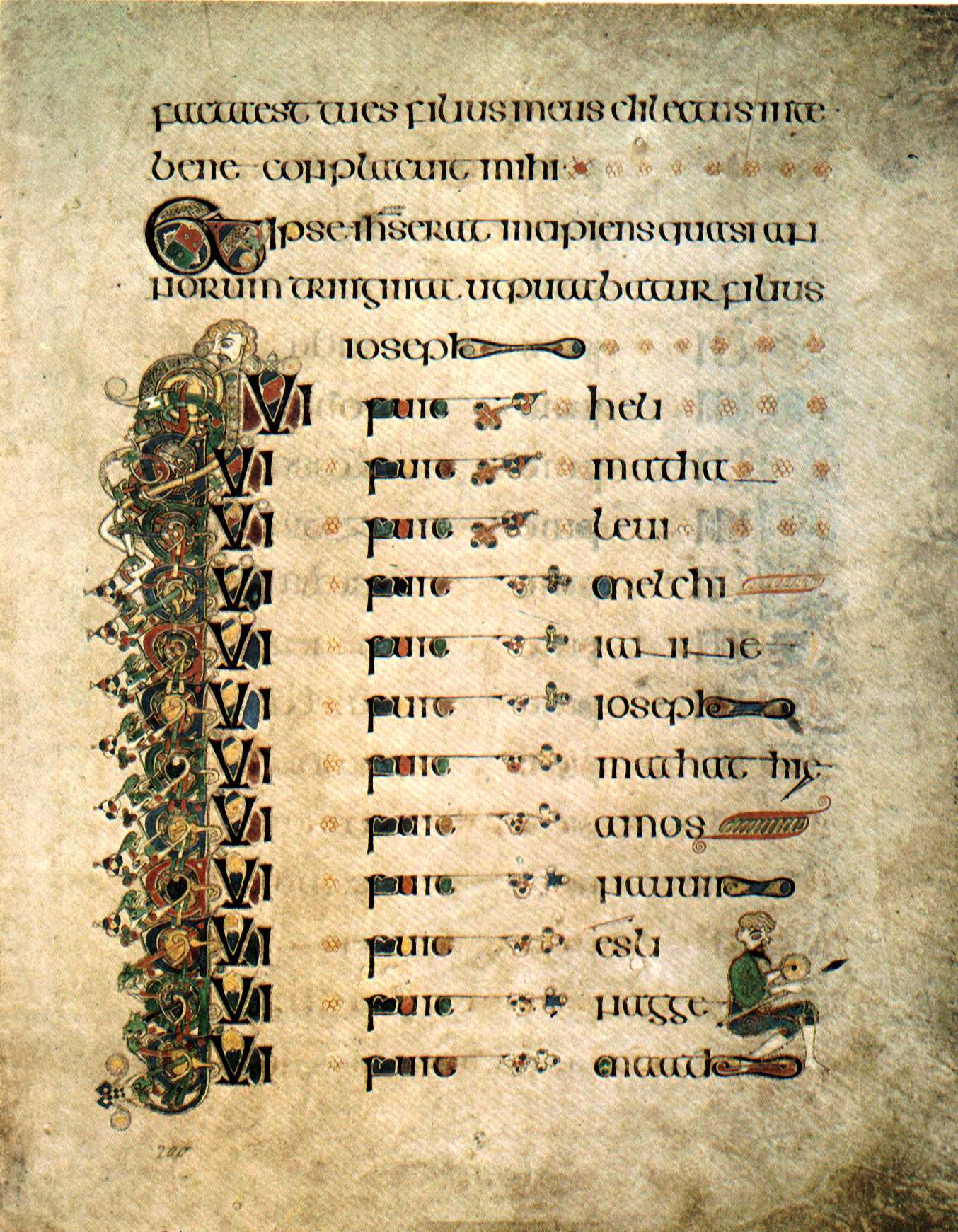
Folio 200r begins Luke's genealogy of Jesus, which runs for five pages.

==== Errors and deviations ====
There are several differences between the text and the accepted Gospels. In the genealogy of Jesus, which starts at Luke 3:23, Kells names an extra ancestor. At Matthew 10:34, a common English translation reads "I came not to send peace, but a sword". However, the manuscript reads gaudium ("joy") where it should read gladium ("sword"), thus translating as "I came not (only) to send peace, but joy." The lavishly decorated opening page of the Gospel according to John had been deciphered by George Bain as: "In principio erat verbum verum" (In the beginning was the True Word). Therefore, the incipit is a free translation into Latin of the Greek original λογος rather than a mere copy of the Roman version.

==== Annotations ====
Over the centuries multiple annotations have been written in the book, recording page information and historical events. During the 19th century, former Trinity Librarian J.H. Todd numbered the book's folios at recto, bottom left. On several of the blank pages among the preliminaries (folios 5v-7r and 27r) are found land charters pertaining to the Abbey of Kells; recording charters in important books was a common custom in the medieval period. James Ussher transcribed the charters in his collected works, and they were later translated into English. A blank page at the end of Luke (folio 289v) contains a poem complaining of taxation upon church land, dated to the 14th or 15th century. In the early 17th century one Richardus Whit recorded several recent events on the same page in "clumsy" Latin, including a famine in 1586, the accession of James I, and plague in Ireland during 1604. The signature of Thomas Ridgeway, 17th century Treasurer of Ireland, is extant on folio 31v, and the 1853 monogram of John O. Westwood, author of an early modern account of the book, is found on 339r.

Three notes concerning the book's pagination are found together on a single page (folio 334v): in 1568 one Geralde Plunket noted his annotations of the Gospel's chapter numbers throughout the book. A second note from 1588 gave a folio count, and a third note by James Ussher reported 344 folios in the book as of 1621. The bifolium 335-336 was lost and subsequently restored in 1741, recorded in two notes on folio 337r. Plunket's accretions were varied and significant. He inscribed transcriptions in the margins of the major illuminated folios 8r, 29r, 203r and 292r. On folio 32v, he added the annotation "Jesus Christus" in the spandrels of the composition's architecture, identifying the portrait's subject as Christ; in the 19th century, this annotation was covered by white paint, altering the composition. Plunket also wrote his name on multiple pages, and added small animal embellishments.

=== Decoration ===
The text is accompanied by many full-page miniature illustrations, while smaller painted decorations appear throughout the text in unprecedented quantities. The decoration of the book is famous for combining intricate detail with bold and energetic compositions. The characteristics of the insular manuscript initial, as described by Carl Nordenfalk, here reach their most extreme realisation: "the initials ... are conceived as elastic forms expanding and contracting with a pulsating rhythm. The kinetic energy of their contours escapes into freely drawn appendices, a spiral line which in turn generates new curvilinear motifs...". The illustrations feature a broad range of colours, with purple, lilac, red, pink, green, and yellow being the colours most often used. Earlier manuscripts tend toward more narrow palettes: the Book of Durrow, for example, uses only four colours. As is usual with insular work, there was no use of gold or silver leaf in the manuscript. The pigments for the illustrations included red and yellow ochre, green copper pigment (sometimes called verdigris), orcein, and woad. It used to be thought that Murex shell purple from the Mediterranean and lapis lazuli from northeast Afghanistan were used. Long considered evidence of the great cost required to create the manuscript, modern examination of the pigments has shown that murex shell purple and lapis lazuli were not used. The woad and lichen used to make the blue and purple pigments are strong evidence of an origin in modern Scotland.

The lavish illumination programme is far greater than any other surviving Insular Gospel book. Thirty-three of the surviving pages contain decorative elements which dominate the entire page. These include ten full-page miniature illustrations: a portrait of the Virgin and Child, three pages of evangelist symbols informed by the tetramorphs described in Ezekiel and Revelation, two evangelist portraits, a portrait of Christ enthroned, a carpet page, and scenes of the Arrest of Jesus and Temptation of Christ. Twelve fully decorated text pages embellish the book's verses, of which the most extreme examples are the four incipits beginning each Gospel, together with the Chi Rho monogram, a page receiving comparable treatment which heralds a "second beginning" of Matthew, the narrative of Christ's life following his genealogy. Another six fully decorated text pages emphasize various points in the Passion story, while a seventh corresponds to the Temptation. The first eleven pages of the extant manuscript begin with a decorated list of Hebrew names, followed by ten pages of Eusebian canon tables framed by architectural elements. Additionally, fourteen pages feature large decorative elements which do not extend throughout the entire page.

It is highly probable that there were other pages of miniature and decorated text that are now lost. Henry identified at least three distinct artists. The "Goldsmith" was responsible for the Chi Rho page, using colour to convey metallic hues. The "Illustrator" was given to idiosyncratic portraits, having produced the Temptation and the Arrest of Christ. The "Portrait Painter" executed the portraits of Christ and the Evangelists. Almost every page contains a decorative element incorporating colour; throughout the text pages, these are commonly stylized capitals. Only two pages—folios 29v and 301v—are devoid of pigment colouration or overt pictorial elements, but even they contain trace decorations in ink.

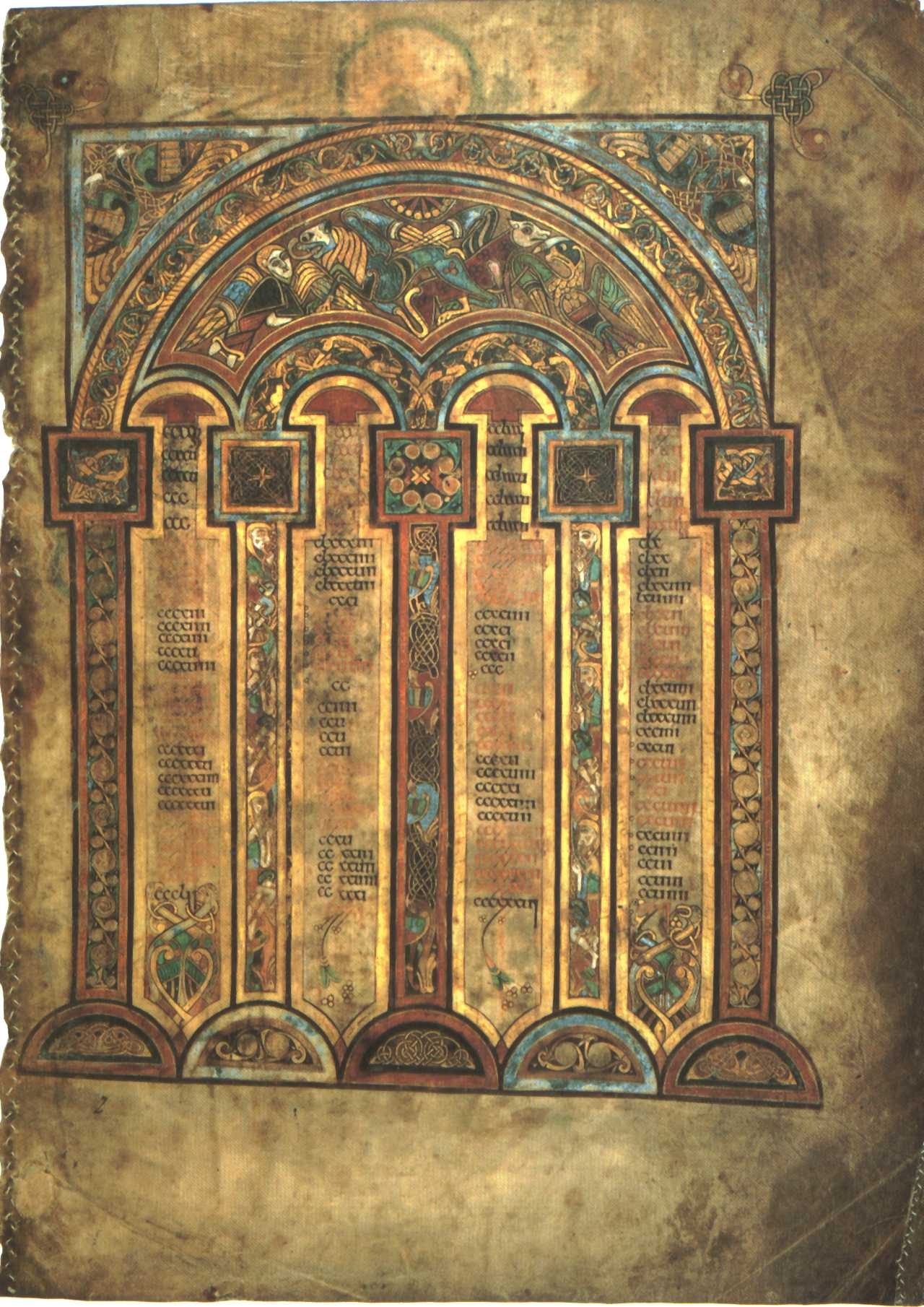
Folio 2r contains one of the Eusebian Canons.

The extant folios of the manuscript start with the fragment of the glossary of Hebrew names. This fragment occupies the left-hand column of folio 1r. A miniature of the four evangelist symbols, now much abraded, occupies the right-hand column. The miniature is oriented so that the volume must be turned ninety degrees to view it properly. The four evangelist symbols are a visual theme that runs throughout the book. They are almost always shown together to emphasise the doctrine of the four Gospels' unity of message.

The unity of the Gospels is further emphasised by the decoration of the Eusebian canon tables. The canon tables illustrate the unity of the Gospels by organising corresponding passages from the Gospels. The Eusebian canon tables normally require twelve pages. In the Book of Kells, the makers of the manuscript planned for twelve pages (folios 1v through 7r) but for unknown reasons, condensed them into ten, leaving folios 6v and 7r blank. This condensation rendered the canon tables unusable. The decoration of the first eight pages of the canon tables is heavily influenced by early Gospel Books from the Mediterranean, where it was traditional to enclose the tables within an arcade (as seen in the London Canon Tables). The Kells manuscript presents this motif in an Insular spirit, where the arcades are not seen as architectural elements but rather become stylised geometric patterns with Insular ornamentation. The four evangelist symbols occupy the spaces under and above the arches. The last two canon tables are presented within a grid. This presentation is limited to Insular manuscripts and was first seen in the Book of Durrow.

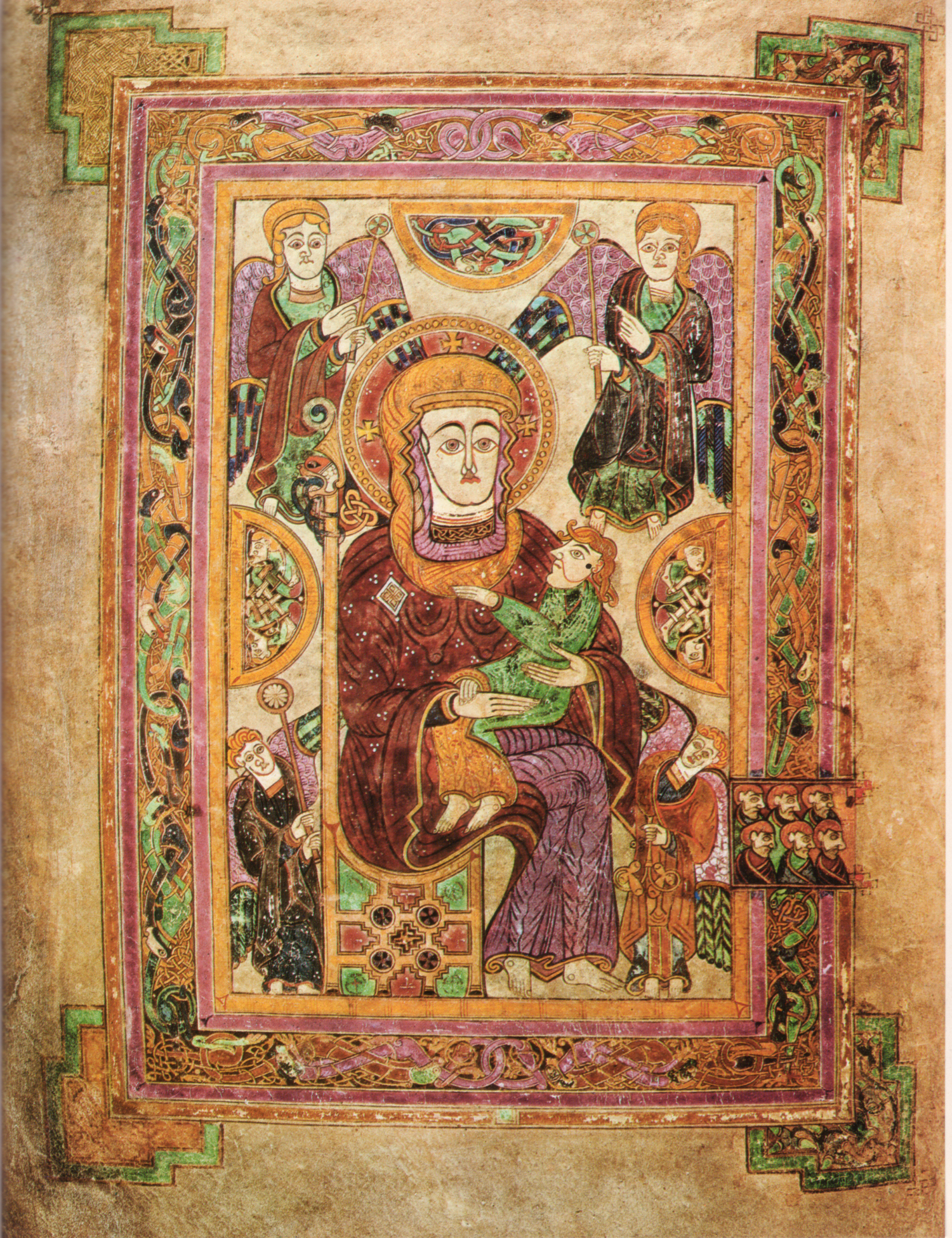
Folio 7v contains an image of the Virgin and Child. This is the oldest extant image of the Virgin Mary in a Western manuscript.

The preliminary matter is introduced by an iconic image of the Virgin and Child (folio 7v), the first representation of the Virgin Mary in a Western manuscript. Mary is shown in an odd mixture of frontal and three-quarter pose. This miniature also bears a stylistic similarity to the carved image on the lid of St. Cuthbert's coffin of 698. The iconography of the miniature seems to derive from Byzantine, Armenian or Coptic art.

The miniature of the Virgin and Child faces the first page of the text, which begins the Breves causae of Matthew with the phrase Nativitas Christi in Bethlem (the birth of Christ in Bethlehem). The beginning page (folio 8r) of the text of the Breves causae is decorated and contained within an elaborate frame. The two-page spread of the miniature and the text makes a vivid introductory statement for the prefatory material. The opening lines of six of the other seven pieces of preliminary matter are enlarged and decorated (see above for the Breves causae of Luke), but no other section of the preliminaries is given the same full-page treatment as the beginning of the Breves causae of Matthew.

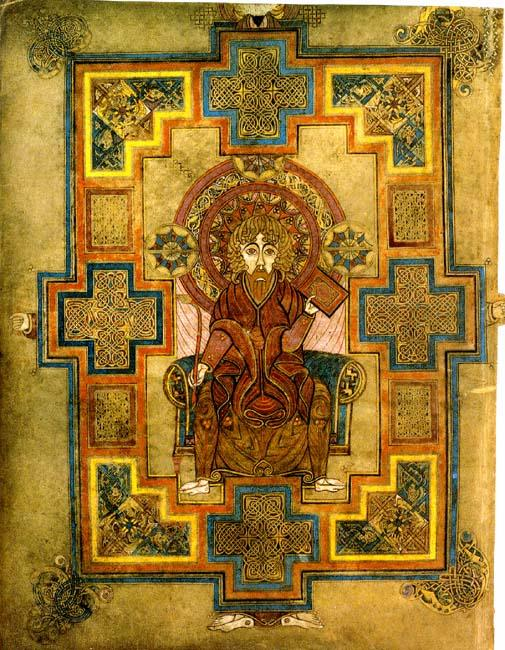
Folio 291v contains a portrait of John the Evangelist.

The book was designed so that each of the Gospels would have an elaborate introductory decorative programme. Each Gospel was originally prefaced by a full-page miniature containing the four evangelist symbols, followed by a blank page. Then came a portrait of the evangelist which faced the opening text of the Gospel, itself given an elaborate decorative treatment. The Gospel of Matthew retains both its Evangelist portrait (folio 28v) and its page of Evangelist symbols (folio 27v, see above). The Gospel of Mark is missing the Evangelist portrait but retains its Evangelist symbols page (folio 129v). The Gospel of Luke is missing both the portrait and the Evangelist symbols page. The Gospel of John, like the Gospel of Matthew, retains both its portrait (folio 291v, see at right) and its Evangelist symbols page (folio 290v). It can be assumed that the portraits for Mark and Luke and the symbols page for Luke at one time existed but have been lost.

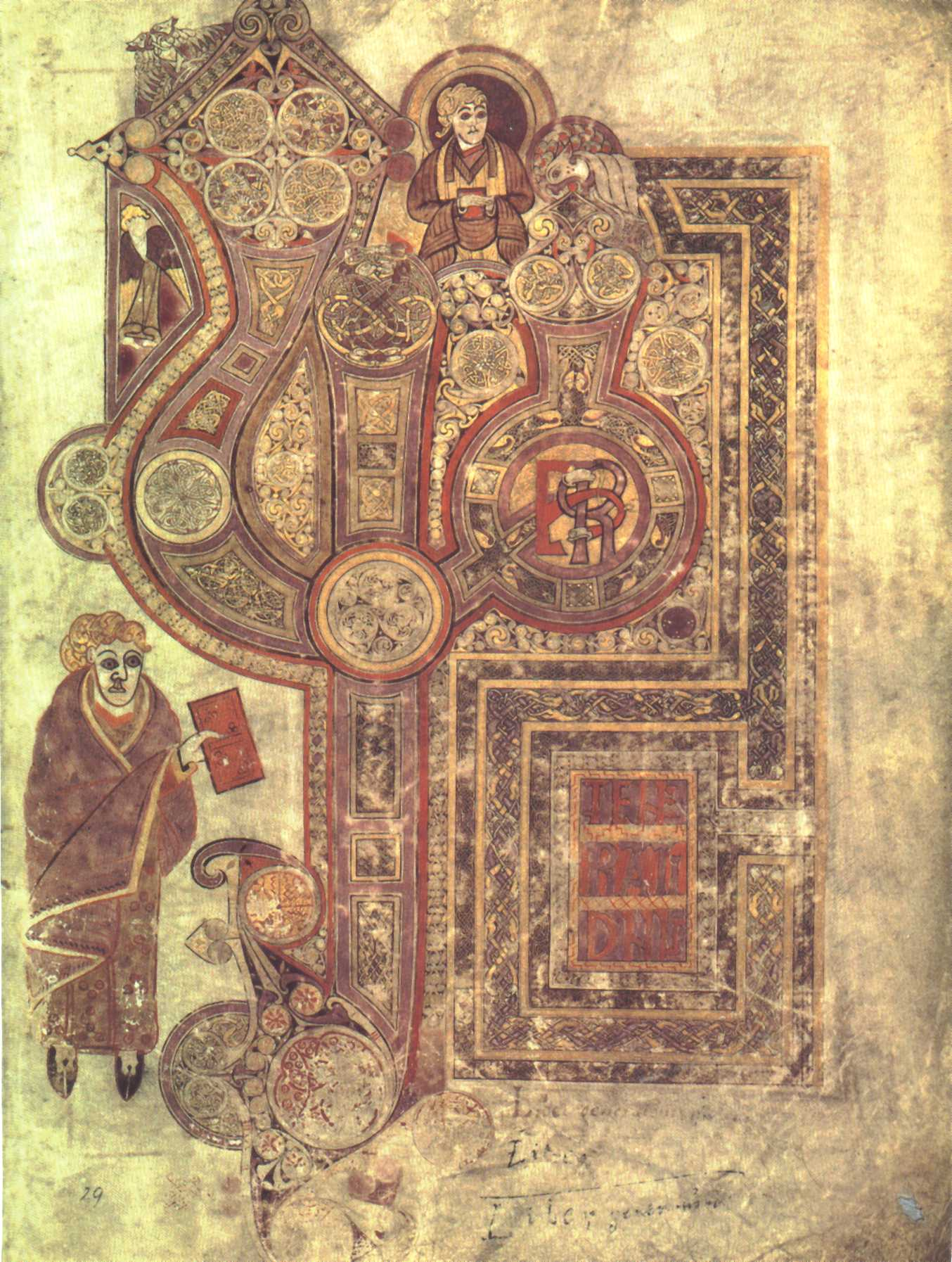
Folio 29r contains the incipit to the Gospel of Matthew.

The ornamentation of the opening few words of each Gospel is lavish; their decoration is so elaborate that the text itself is almost illegible. The opening page (folio 29r) of Matthew may stand as an example. (See illustration at left.) The page consists of only two words: Liber generationis ("The book of the generation"). The lib of Liber is turned into a giant monogram which dominates the entire page. The er of Liber is presented as an interlaced ornament within the b of the lib monogram. Generationis is broken into three lines and contained within an elaborate frame in the right lower quadrant of the page. The entire assemblage is contained within an elaborate border, further decorated with elaborate spirals and knot work, many of which are zoomorphic.

The opening words of the gospel of Mark, Initium evangelii Iesu Christi ("The beginning of the Gospel of Jesus Christ"), Luke, Quoniam ("Forasmuch"), and John, In principio erat verbum verum ("In the beginning was the True Word"), are all given similar treatments. Although the decoration of these pages was most extensive in the Book of Kells, they are all decorated in the other Insular Gospel books.

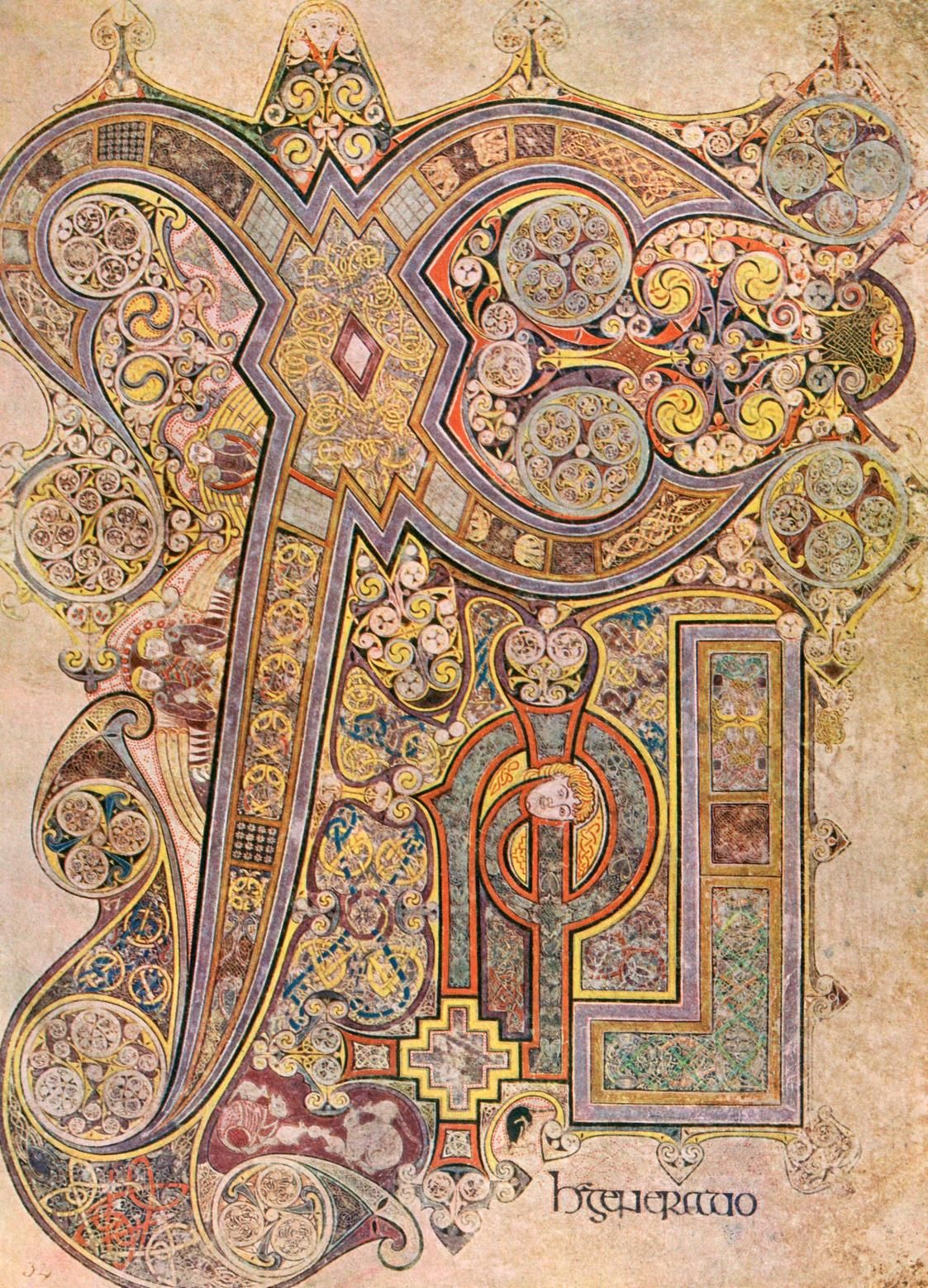
Folio 34r contains the Chi Rho monogram. Chi and rho are the first two letters of the word Christ in Greek.

The Gospel of Matthew begins with a genealogy of Jesus, followed by his portrait. Folio 32v (top of article) has a miniature of Christ enthroned, flanked by peacocks. Peacocks function as symbols of Christ throughout the book. According to earlier accounts given by Isidore of Seville and Augustine in The City of God, the peacocks' flesh does not putrefy; the animals therefore became associated with Christ via the Resurrection. Facing the portrait of Christ on folio 33r is the only carpet page in the Book of Kells, which is rather anomalous; the Lindisfarne Gospels have five extant carpet pages and the Book of Durrow has six. The blank verso of folio 33 faces the single most lavish miniature of the early medieval period, the Book of Kells Chi Rho monogram, which serves as incipit for the narrative of the life of Christ.

At Matthew 1:18 (folio 34r), the actual narrative of Christ's life starts. This "second beginning" to Matthew was given emphasis in many early Gospel Books, so much so that the two sections were often treated as separate works. The second beginning starts with the word Christ. The Greek letters chi and rho were normally used in medieval manuscripts to abbreviate the word Christ. In Insular Gospel books, the initial Chi Rho monogram was enlarged and decorated. In the Book of Kells, this second beginning was given a decorative programme equal to those prefacing the Gospels, its Chi Rho monogram having grown to consume the entire page. The letter chi dominates the page with one arm swooping across the majority of the page. The letter rho is snuggled underneath the arms of the chi. Both letters are divided into compartments which are lavishly decorated with knotwork and other patterns. The background is likewise awash in a mass of swirling and knotted decoration. Within this mass of decoration are hidden animals and insects. Three angels arise from one of the cross arms of the chi. This miniature is the largest and most lavish extant Chi Rho monogram in any Insular Gospel book, the culmination of a tradition that started with the Book of Durrow.

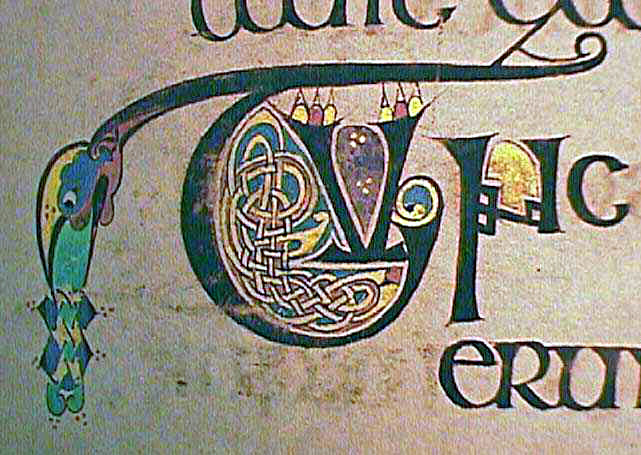
Folio 74r, detail. Almost all of the folios of the Book of Kells contain small illuminations like this decorated initial.

The Book of Kells contains two other full-page illustrations, which depict episodes from the Passion story. The text of Matthew is illustrated with a full-page illumination of the Arrest of Christ (folio 114r). Jesus is shown beneath a stylised arcade while being held by two much smaller figures. In the text of Luke, there is a full-sized miniature of the Temptation of Christ (folio 202v). Christ is shown from the waist up on top of the Temple. To his right is a crowd of people, perhaps representing his disciples. To his left and below him is a black figure of Satan. Above him hover two angels.

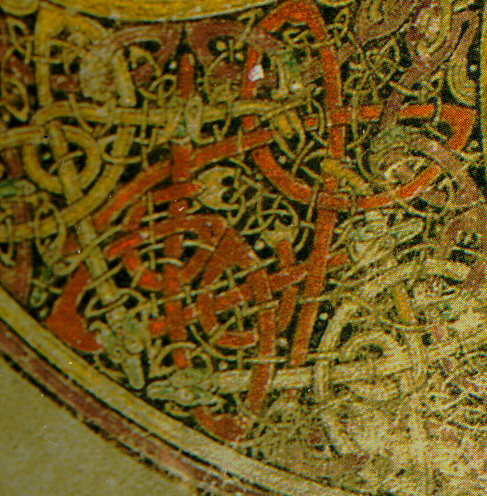
Folio 34r, detail. The decorations of the Book of Kells can be stunningly complex, as seen in this small detail of the Chi Rho monogram page.

Throughout the body of the Gospels, six fully decorated text pages receive treatment comparable to that of the page which began the Breves causae of Matthew. Of these, five correspond to episodes in the Passion story, and one refers to the Temptation. The verso of the folio containing the Arrest of Christ (114v) has a full page of decorated text which reads "Tunc dicit illis Iesus omnes vos scan(dalum)" (Matthew 26:31), where Jesus addresses his disciples immediately before his arrest. A few pages later (folio 124r) is found a very similar decoration of the phrase "Tunc crucifixerant Xpi cum eo duos latrones" (Matthew 27:38), Christ's crucifixion together with two thieves. In the Gospel of Mark, another decorated page (folio 183r) gives a description of the Crucifixion (Mark 15:25), while the final (and decorated) page of Mark (folio 187v) describes Christ's Resurrection and Ascension (Mark 16:19–20). In the Gospel of Luke, folio 203r faces the illustration of the Temptation, itself an illumination of the text (Luke 4:1) beginning the Temptation narrative. Finally, folio 285r is a fully decorated page corresponding to another moment of the Passion, (Luke 23:56-Luke 24:1) between the Crucifixion and the Resurrection. Since the missing folios of John contain another Passion narrative, it is likely that John contained full pages of decorated text that have been lost.

Apart from the thirty-three fully illuminated pages, fourteen receive substantial decoration not extending over the entire page. Among the Preliminaries and apart from the fully decorated page beginning the Breves causae of Matthew, six pages begin six of the eight sections of Breves causae and Argumenta with embellished names. The exception is folio 24v which introduces the final section of the Breves causae of John without a comparable device. Five pages (folios 200r-202v) give an organized decoration of Luke's genealogy of Christ, just before the Temptation narrative. Another three pages contain large illuminated elements not extending throughout the entire page. Folio 40v contains text of the Beatitudes in Matthew (Matthew 5:3–10) where the letters B beginning each line are linked into an ornate chain along the left margin of the page. Folio 127v has an embellished line beginning the final chapter of Matthew, which gives an account of the Resurrection. A similar treatment is given to a line in folio 188v (Luke 1:5), which begins an account of the Nativity.

== Purpose ==
The book had a sacramental rather than educational purpose. Such a large, lavish Gospel would have been left on the high altar of the church and removed only for the reading of the Gospel during Mass, with the reader probably reciting from memory more than reading the text. It is significant that the Chronicles of Ulster state the book was stolen from the sacristy, where the vessels and other accoutrements of the Mass were stored, rather than from the monastic library. Its design seems to take this purpose in mind; that is, the book was produced with appearance taking precedence over practicality. There are numerous uncorrected mistakes in the text. Lines were often completed in a blank space in the line above. The chapter headings that were necessary to make the canon tables usable were not inserted into the margins of the page. In general, nothing was done to disrupt the look of the page: aesthetics were given priority over utility.

== Reproductions ==
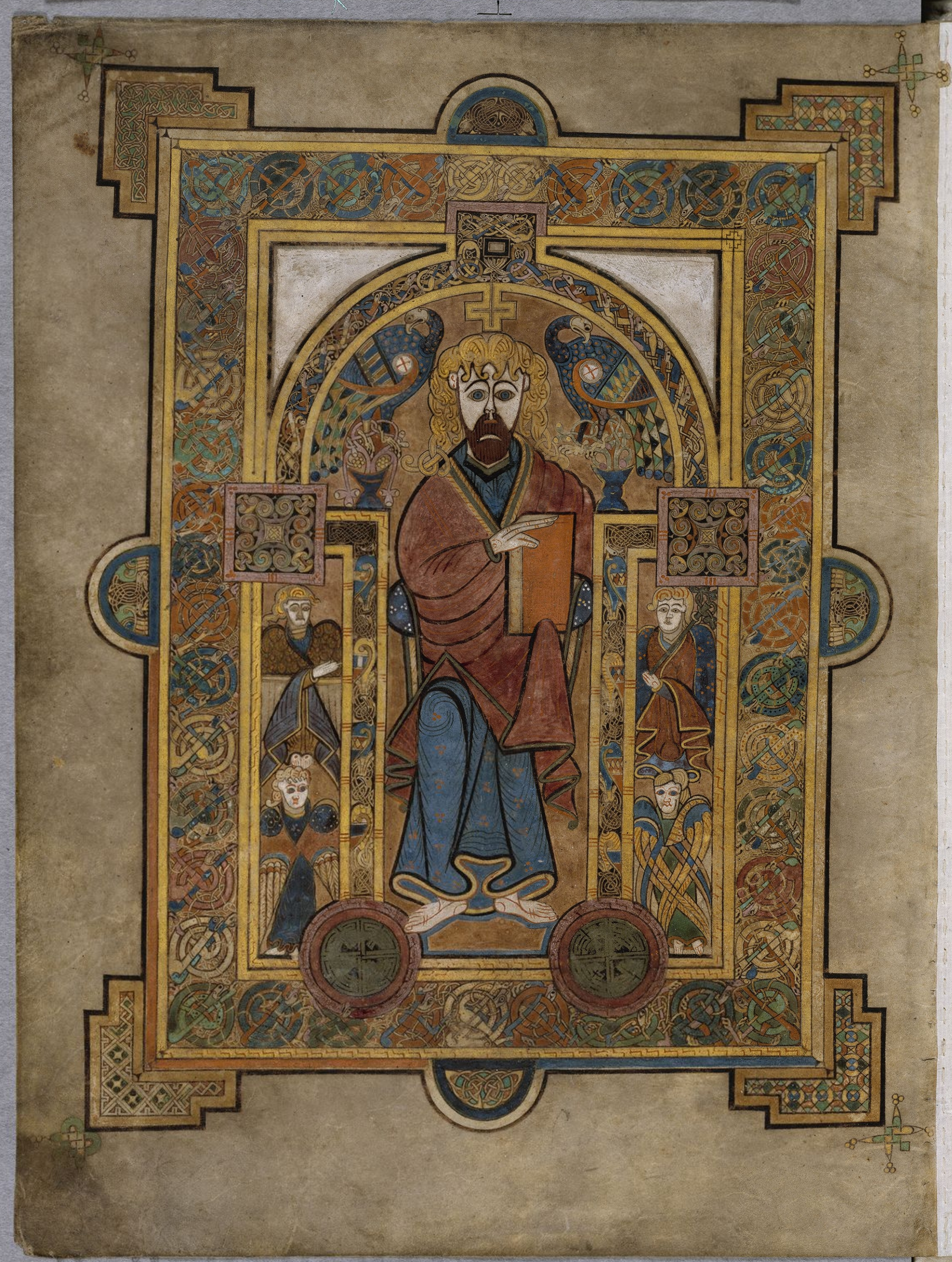
Folio 32v, as reproduced by Faksimile-Verlag.

Some of the first faithful reproductions made of pages and elements of the Book of Kells were by the artist Helen Campbell D'Olier in the 19th century. She used vellum and reproduced the pigments used in the original manuscript. Photographs of her drawings were included in Sullivan's study of the Book of Kells, first printed in 1913.

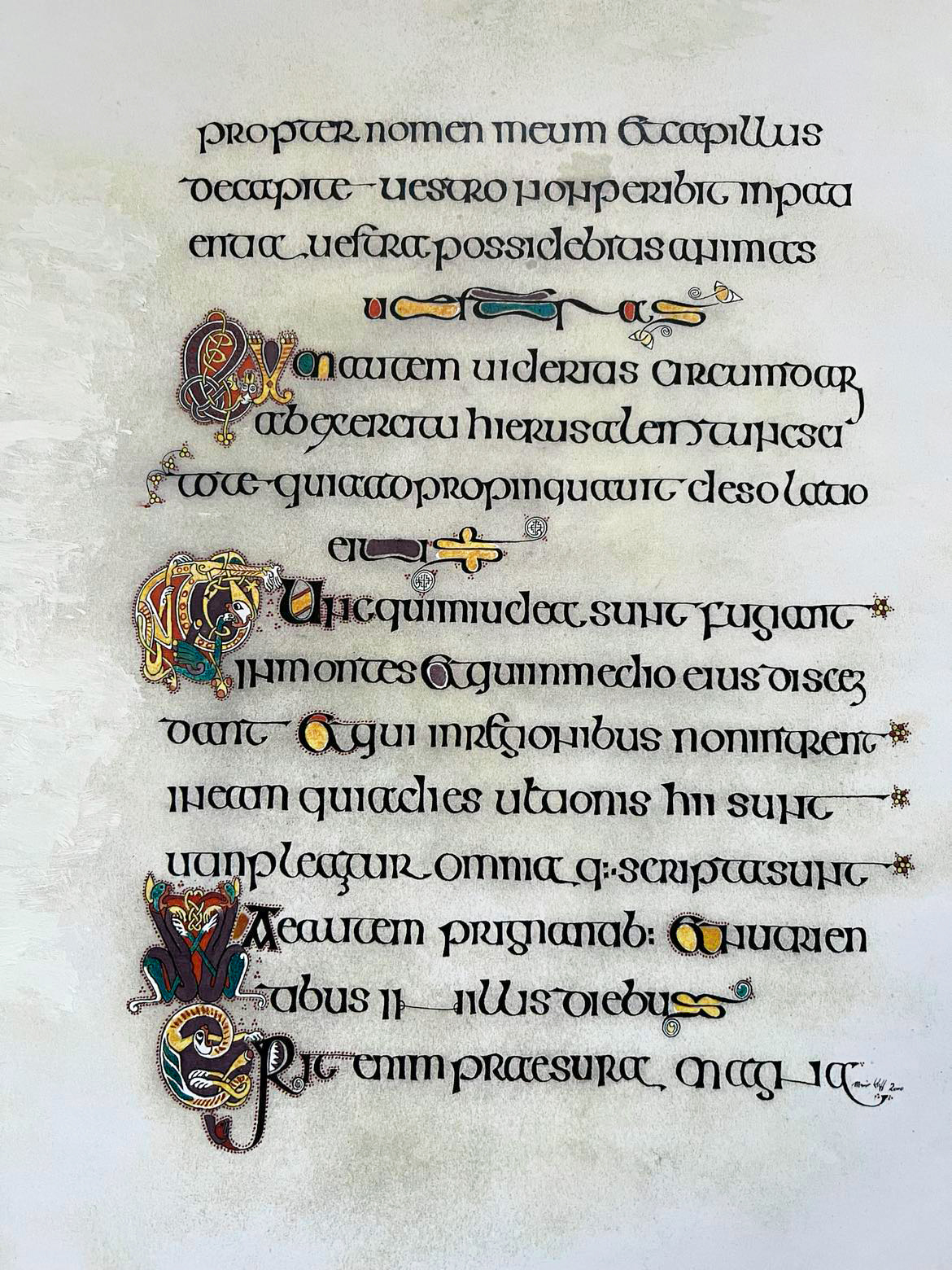
Folio 271v: Handcrafted reproduction, featuring intricate Latin script: "Propter nomen meum et capillus de capite vestro non peribit; in patientia vestra possidebitis animas vestras."

In 1951, the Swiss publisher Urs Graf Verlag Bern produced the first facsimile of the Book of Kells. The majority of the pages were reproduced in black-and-white photographs, but the edition also featured forty-eight colour reproductions, including all the full-page decorations. Under licence from the Board of Trinity College Dublin, Thames and Hudson produced a partial facsimile edition in 1974, which included a scholarly treatment of the work by Françoise Henry. This edition included all the full-page illustrations in the manuscript and a representative selection of the ornamentation of the text pages, together with some enlarged details of the illustrations. The reproductions were all in full colour, with photography by John Kennedy, Green Studio, Dublin.

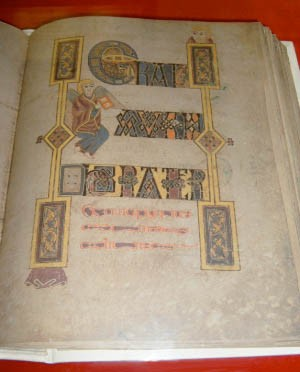
Folio 183r from the 1990 facsimile of the Book of Kells contains the text "Erat autem hora tertia" ("now it was the third hour").

In 1979, Swiss publisher Faksimile-Verlag Luzern requested permission to produce a full-colour facsimile of the book. Permission was initially denied because Trinity College officials felt that the risk of damage to the book was too high. By 1986, Faksimile-Verlag had developed a process that used gentle suction to straighten a page so that it could be photographed without touching it and so won permission to publish a new facsimile. After each page was photographed, a single-page facsimile was prepared so the colours could be carefully compared to the original and adjustments made where necessary. The completed work was published in 1990 in a two-volume set containing the full facsimile and scholarly commentary. One copy is held by the Anglican Church in Kells, on the site of the original monastery.

The ill-fated Celtworld heritage centre, which opened in Tramore, County Waterford in 1992, included a replica of the Book of Kells. It cost approximately £18,000 to produce. In 1994, Bernard Meehan, Keeper of Manuscripts at Trinity College Dublin, produced an introductory booklet on the Book of Kells, with 110 colour images of the manuscript. His 2012 book contained more than 80 pages from the manuscript reproduced full-size and in full colour.

A digital copy of the manuscript was produced by Trinity College in 2006 and made available for purchase through Trinity College on DVD-ROM. It included the ability to leaf through each page, view two pages at a time, or look at a single page in a magnified setting. There were also commentary tracks about the specific pages as well as the history of the book. Users were given the option to search by specific illuminated categories including animals, capitols and angels. It retailed for approximately €30 but has since been discontinued. The Faksimile-Verlag images are now online at Trinity College's Digital Collections portal.

== Significance ==
The Ireland in which the Book of Kells was crafted and manufactured, writes Christopher de Hamel, "was clearly no primitive backwater but a civilization which could now read Latin, although never occupied by the Romans, and which was somehow familiar with texts and artistic designs which have unambiguous parallels in the Coptic and Greek churches, such as carpet pages and Canon tables. Although the Book of Kells itself is as uniquely Irish as anything imaginable, it is a Mediterranean text and the pigments used in making it include orpiment, a yellow made from arsenic sulphide, exported from Italy, where it is found in volcanoes. There are clearly lines of trade and communication unknown to us."

In 2011, UNESCO added the book to its Memory of the World International Register, recognising it as a globally important historical document.

== In popular culture ==
The 2009 animated film The Secret of Kells tells a fictional story of the creation of the Book of Kells by an elderly monk Aidan and his young apprentice Brendan, who struggle to work on the manuscript in the face of destructive Viking raids. It was directed by Tomm Moore and nominated for the Academy Award for Best Animated Feature in 2009.

== Sources ==
- Alexander, J.J.G. (1978). Insular Manuscripts: Sixth to Ninth Century. London: Harvey Miller. ISBN 0-905203-01-1.
- Brown, Peter (1980). The Book of Kells: Forty-Eight Pages and Details in Color from The Manuscript in Trinity College, Dublin. New York: Alfred A Knopf. ISBN 0-394-73960-4.
- Calkins, Robert G. (1983). Illuminated Books of the Middle Ages. Ithaca, NY: Cornell University Press. ISBN 0-8014-1506-3.
- Dodwell, Charles Reginald (1993). The pictorial arts of the West, 800–1200. New Haven: Yale University Press. ISBN 0-300-06493-4.
- Fuchs, Robert; Oltrogge, Doris (1994). "Colour material and painting technique in the Book of Kells". In O'Mahony, Felicity (ed.). The Book of Kells: Proceedings of a conference at Trinity College, Dublin, September 6–9, 1992. Brookfield, Vt.: Scolar Press. pp. 133–171. ISBN 0-85967-967-5.
- Gwynn, Aubrey (September 1954). "Some Notes on the History of the Book of Kells". Irish Historical Studies. 9 (34): 131–161. doi:10.1017/S0021121400028832. JSTOR 30005685.
- de Hamel, Christopher (2016). Meetings with Remarkable Manuscripts. Allen Lane. ISBN 978-0-241-00304-6.
- Henderson, George (1987). From Durrow to Kells: The Insular Gospel-books, 650–800. New York: Thames and Hudson. ISBN 0-500-23474-4.
- Henry, Françoise (1974). The Book of Kells: Reproductions from the Manuscript in Trinity College, Dublin. New York: Alfred A Knopf. ISBN 0-394-49475-X.
- Keyes, Thomas (3 November 2022). "Recreating the Book of Kells". Historic Environment Scotland.
- Meehan, Bernard (1994). The Book of Kells: An Illustrated Introduction to the Manuscript in Trinity College Dublin. New York: Thames and Hudson. ISBN 0-500-27790-7.
- Meyvaert, Paul (March 1989). "The Book of Kells and Iona". The Art Bulletin. 71 (1). College Art Association: 6–19. doi:10.2307/3051211. JSTOR 3051211.
- Nordenfalk, Carl (1977). Celtic and Anglo-Saxon Painting: Book Illumination in the British Isles 600–800. New York: George Braziller. ISBN 0-8076-0825-4.
- Sullivan, Edward (1952). The Book of Kells. London: Studio Publications. ISBN 1-85170-196-6.
- Walther, Ingo F.; Wolk, Norbert (2001). Codices Illustres: The World's Most Famous Illuminated Manuscripts, 400 to 1600. Köln: Taschen. ISBN 3-8228-5852-8.
- Welch, Robert (2000). The Concise Oxford Companion to Irish Literature. Oxford University Press. ISBN 9780192800800.
- Werner, Martin (June 1972). "The Madonna and Child Miniature in the Book of Kells, Part II". The Art Bulletin. 54 (2). College Art Association: 129–139. doi:10.2307/3048962. JSTOR 3048962.
