= Howlers =

Howlers may refer to:

- A fictional species of Alien from Animorphs
- A type of Mathematical Fallacy

== See also ==
- Howl
- Howling
