= Howling II =

(The) Howling II may refer to:

- The Howling II (novel), a 1979 horror novel by Gary Brandne
- Howling II: Your Sister Is a Werewolf, a 1985 American horror film

== See also ==
- Howling (disambiguation)
