= Howl (video game) =

2023 video game

- Developer: Mi'pu'mi Games
- Publisher: Astragon Entertainment
- Platforms: Windows, Nintendo Switch, PlayStation 5, Xbox Series X/S, Android, iOS
- Release: November 14, 2023 (Windows, Switch); February 7, 2024 (Android); March 1, 2024 (iOS)
- Genre: Puzzle video game
- Mode: Single-player

Howl is a turn-based puzzle video game developed by Austrian studio Mi'pu'mi Games and published by Astragon Entertainment. The game takes place in a dark fantasy folktale setting where a mysterious "Howling Plague" has begun turning those who hear it into werewolves. It was initially released for Windows and Nintendo Switch on November 14, 2023, followed by PlayStation 5 and Xbox Series X/S on January 26, 2024, Android on February 7, 2024 and iOS on March 1, 2024. The main character, The Prophet, is deaf and therefore immune to the plague. She sets out in search of a cure and to find her missing brother. She must either sneak past or defeat the werewolves in each level to escape. Howl received mixed reception from critics, who praised its aesthetics and theme, but disliked its low amount of story, believing it did not do justice to the interesting premise. Critics were also split on its gameplay, with some wishing it had more tactical elements.

== Gameplay ==
The game is split into maps in which the player character must navigate to the exit while avoiding or defeating werewolves. Players start with three actions per round, but can upgrade them to six eventually. Players can shoot a limited number of arrows, as well as push enemies into other enemies or inanimate objects to injure them. Successfully beating a level grants Confidence, which can be traded for new or upgraded skills. Defeating enemies grants Skulls, which can unlock new paths or more advanced levels. Levels can be replayed for full completion.

The game shows predicted enemy behavior by default, but an optional hard mode leaves enemy predictions invisible. In earlier versions of the game, hard mode was normal mode and selected by default, and normal mode was easy mode.

== Plot ==
The main character is The Prophet, a deaf woman who is the latest in a line of people who can fight against the Howl, a curse that turns those who hear it into mindless wolf-like beasts. Once it begins to spread, she goes on a quest to find her lost brother and save innocent people who are in danger from the werewolves. She travels through several devastated regions as she attempts to reach the Cathedral, where the land's prophets are created in a ritual that links them to fate itself, allowing them to divine the future. However, the Cathedral's scrolls have been tainted by darkness, and every one of its denizens have turned into beasts. When she arrives in the Cathedral's inner sanctum, she discovers that her brother was incorrectly chosen to become a prophet, which caused the ritual to fail and him to become the most powerful beast, also becoming the origin of the Howl due to his influence over fate. She defeats her brother, causing him to transform back into a human and banishing the Howl, and the two reunite and return to living together.

A separate side chapter was patched into the game post-release, in which The Prophet fights her way into the land's capital city in search of a rumored cure for the Howl.

== Development ==
Mi'pu'mi Games is a studio based in Austria that specializes in short games and assisting with the development of AAA games, and based the themes of the game on Grimms' Fairy Tales, which most of the development team grew up with. The game's graphics were designed based on the idea of a "living ink" scroll that wrote itself as the player progressed, and were inspired by illuminated manuscripts like the Book of Kells. This reflects the player's role as a prophet.

== Reception ==
Reception

Aggregate scores
Aggregator	Score
Metacritic	(PC) 82/100 (NS) 70/100
OpenCritic	75% recommend

Review score
Publication	Score
TouchArcade	4/5

According to review aggregator website Metacritic, the game received "generally favorable" reviews on Windows, while receiving "mixed or average reviews" on the Switch. OpenCritic determined that 75% of critics recommended the game.

Shaun Musgrave of TouchArcade rated the game's Switch version highly, saying that while it "completely fails to deliver" on its premise, it nevertheless had interesting gameplay that opened up the later in the game it was, allowing the player to solve it in various ways. Daniel Bueno of Siliconera also gave the Switch version a high rating, describing it as "delightful" and praising the game's presentation. He believed that its ideas could have been expanded on and developed more, and that its enemy variety could have been better, but nevertheless thought that it did not overstay its welcome. Cosmin Vasile of Softpedia positively reviewed the PC version, praising the combat and narrative, as well as its accessibility, but remarked that it could have used less repetition. Matt S. of Digitally Downloaded gave it a more mixed review, comparing it to ChuChu Rocket! but not as interesting, while describing the requirement to replay levels in order to collect all possible skulls as "terrible game design" and padding. He stated that the game would have been better as a shorter and more focused title of half the length. Lauren Morton of PC Gamer described Howl as "chess-like" and its setting as "enticing".
