= Bloodlines (Howl album) =

Studio album by Howl
- Released: April 26, 2013
- Recorded: Early 2012 at Planet Z studio in Hadley, Massachusetts
- Genre: Sludge metal
- Length: 39:53
- Label: Relapse
- Producer: Chris "Zeuss" Harris

Howl chronology
| Full of Hell (2010) | Bloodlines (2013) |

Professional ratings
Review scores
| Source | Rating |
|---|---|
| Exclaim! | 6/10 |
| Pitchfork Media | 6.3/10 |
| PopMatters | 4/10 |

Bloodlines is the second studio album by American sludge metal band Howl. The album is set for release in Germany and Benelux on April 26, 2013, in the rest of Europe on April 29 and in North America on April 30, under Relapse Records. The album was produced by Chris "Zeuss" Harris, and recorded in early 2012 at Planet Z studio in Hadley, Massachusetts.

== Track listing ==
| No. | Title | Length |
|---|---|---|
| 1. | "Attrition" | 3:14 |
| 2. | "Midnight Eyes" | 4:14 |
| 3. | "Demonic" | 3:29 |
| 4. | "One Last Nail" | 3:05 |
| 5. | "Down so Low" | 3:28 |
| 6. | "Your Hell Begins" | 4:50 |
| 7. | "With a Blade" | 5:22 |
| 8. | "Of War" | 2:59 |
| 9. | "The Mouth of Madness" | 4:28 |
| 10. | "Embrace Your Nerve" | 4:44 |
