= Howl (Howl EP) =

EP by Howl
- Released: 2008
- Genre: Doom metal, sludge metal
- Length: 13:54
- Label: Self-released, Relapse

Howl chronology
| Howl (2008) | Full of Hell (2010) |

Professional ratings
Review scores
| Source | Rating |
|---|---|
| Decibel | (favorable) |

Howl is an EP and first release by American doom metal band Howl. It was originally released independently in 2008, and was reissued on July 21, 2009, following the band's signing with Relapse Records.

== Track listing ==
| No. | Title | Length |
|---|---|---|
| 1. | "Oma" | 4:04 |
| 2. | "And the Gnawing..." | 5:17 |
| 3. | "Kings That Steal" | 4:33 |
| Total length: | | 13:54 |

== Credits ==
- Vincent Hausman – guitar, vocals
- Andrea Black – guitar
- Robert Icaza – bass
- Timmy St. Amour – drums
