= Helen Campbell D'Olier =

Scottish artist and illustrator

Helen Campbell D’Olier
- Born: Helen Campbell Lawson; 1829; Edinburgh, Scotland
- Died: 29 June 1887 (aged 57/58)
- Known for: reproductions of the Book of Kells

Helen Campbell D’Olier (1829 - 1887) was a Scottish artist best known for her reproductions from early-Christian illuminated manuscripts.

== Life and family ==
Born in Edinburgh, the daughter of James Lawson, she received some instruction in drawing and painting from William Simpson RSA. In 1849 she moved to Ireland having married Dublin barrister John Rutherford D’Olier (1816–1899). They had two children Helen Lawson D'Olier (d. 1948) and Isaac Matthew D'Olier (1850–1913). D'Olier died on 29 June 1887.

== Artistic work ==
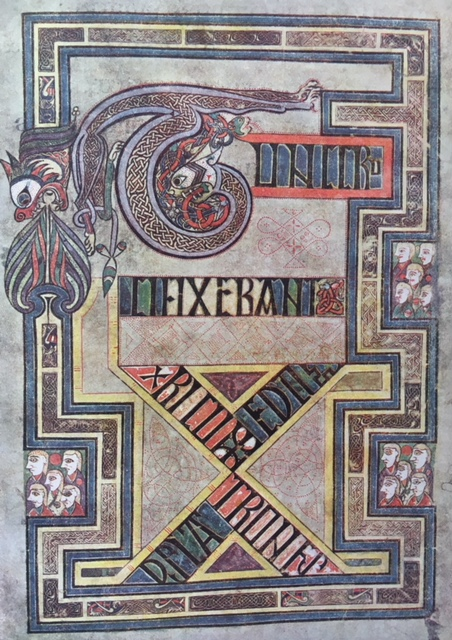
Edward Sullivan (1914), The Book of Kells Plate XI by H. D'Olier

While she did produce some traditional landscape paintings, it is for her skill in reproducing illuminations from medieval manuscripts and particularly from the Book of Kells for which this artist is best remembered. Her copies, on vellum, of the illustrations in the 9th-century Book of Kells, are noted for their accuracy and fidelity. D'Olier spent many years copying these illustrations, at a time when copyists were permitted to work directly from the manuscript itself. It can be seen, from her surviving drawings, that D'Olier had been permitted to trace the designs directly from the pages of the manuscript.

Apart from her meticulous reproductions D'Olier researched the history of the manuscripts, particularly the origins of the pigments used to decorate them. D'Olier would trace illustrations such as the passion of Christ from the Book of the De Burgos. In 1884 she lectured on the subject in Alexandra College, showing magic lantern-slides of her work. Some of her illustrations were included in a lecture on the Book of Kells given by Professor J.D. Westwood in Oxford, which was published in 1887. Her work was also included in a paper read to the Dublin Society in 1887 by Professor W.J.Hartley She is known to have worked on the Lindisfarne Gospels and the Bodleian's Liber Sacramentorum. Her work was exhibited in the Dublin Exhibition of 1861 and 1872.

In 1914 Sir Edward Sullivan (1852–1928) produced a very popular book on the Book of Kells with 24 full-colour plates. At the time it was technically easier to reproduce drawings than photographs in illustrated books, and so the images used in Sullivan's book were made by Helen D'Olier. James Joyce is known to have owned a copy of this book which he took with him wherever he went. He told Arthur Powers (1891–1984) that the Book of Kells was ‘the most purely Irish thing we have’ and that he 'pored over' Sullivan's book 'for hours'. When Joyce was exclaiming in Finnegans Wake over the 'Tunc page', as he calls Matthew 27:38, he was in fact basing his observations on images made by D'Olier.
