= Full of Hell (album) =

Studio album by Howl
- Released: May 11, 2010
- Recorded: December 2009 at Machine with Magnets Studios in Pawtucket, Rhode Island, United States
- Genre: Sludge metal
- Length: 43:30
- Label: Relapse
- Producer: Keith Souza

Howl chronology
Howl (2008)	Full of Hell (2010)	Bloodlines (2013)

Full of Hell is the debut studio album by American sludge metal band Howl, released through Relapse Records on May 11, 2010. After signing a recording contract with Relapse Records in May 2009, Howl re-released their self-titled EP, Howl, on July 21, 2009. To promote the EP, the band toured East Coast between August and October 2009, while worked composing new songs. The band recorded Full of Hell at Machine with Magnets Studios in Pawtucket, Rhode Island with engineers Keith Souza and Seth Manchester in late December 2009. Upon finished work, guitarist and lead vocalist Vincent Hausman told Noisecreep: "The new album is, if anything, more extreme than the EP, moving from aggression to slow doom metal, through both black metal atmospheres and blues-based harmonies. We really tried to incorporate the various styles in metal we love, though never losing sight of what this band is ultimately about: the almighty riff."

Hausman explained to Verbicide Magazine that Full of Hell is dedicated to "all [people] who were made to feel out of place in school or church, for those [...] who were made to feel guilty about doing what [they] wanted, for those [...] who others called 'fags', 'weirdos', and 'losers'." He added, "This is for us, for the metalheads. We are full of hell." The album's simplistic lyrical theme was unnoticed by critics, who praised mostly the band's aggressive musicianship. Exclaim! magazine noted Howl's take on the doom metal genre as "something unique, violent and ugly, but there's also heaps of potential for a bit of just-beyond-underground recognition". The A.V. Club described the album by saying: "Heavy, bossy doom with just enough stoner-fuzz elements to build into something much more crushing, Full of Hell features enjoyable wacko lyrics, a super-tight songwriting structure, and a solid sound that seems like it's coming from a much more seasoned band."

== Track listing ==
All songs written and composed by Howl, except where noted.

1. "Horns of Steel" – 3:26
2. "You Jackals Beware" – 5:35
3. "Gods in Broken Men" – 3:12
4. "Asherah" (Howl, Chris McClenning) – 1:07
5. "Jezebel" – 4:25
6. "Heavenless" – 5:33
7. "The Scorpion's Last Sting" – 5:51
8. "Parish of the Obscene" – 4:04
9. "The Day of Rest" – 10:17

== Personnel ==
- Howl – composer, producer
- Vincent Hausman – guitar, vocals
- Andrea Black – guitar
- Rob Icaza – bass, vocals
- Timmy St. Amour – drums, vocals
- Chris McClenning – composer
- Keith Souza – producer, engineer, mixing
- Seth Manchester – engineer, mixing
- Alan Douches – mastering
- Ryan Begley – artwork
- Orion Landau – design
