= Howling (disambiguation) =

Howling is a vocal form of animal communication.

Howling may also refer to:

- The Howling (franchise), the fiction franchise
  - The Howling, the original 1977 horror novel
  - The Howling (film), the original 1981 film loosely based on the novel
- Howling (2012 film), a South Korean film
- Howling, a fictional village in which the 1932 novel Cold Comfort Farm is set
- Howling (The Saints album), 1996
- Howling (The Angels album), 1986
- Howlin' (Jagwar Ma album), 2013
- "Howling" (Abingdon Boys School song), by Japanese rock band Abingdon Boys School
- "Howling" (Hitomi Yaida song), a 2000 single by Hitomi Yaida
- "Howling", a 2020 song by Victon
- The Howling (EP), a 2007 EP by Within Temptation
- Teddy Howling (1885–1955), English footballer
- Damian Walshe-Howling (born 1971), Australian actor
- LaRod Stephens-Howling (born 1987), American football player

== See also ==
- Howl (disambiguation)
