= Durham Gospels =

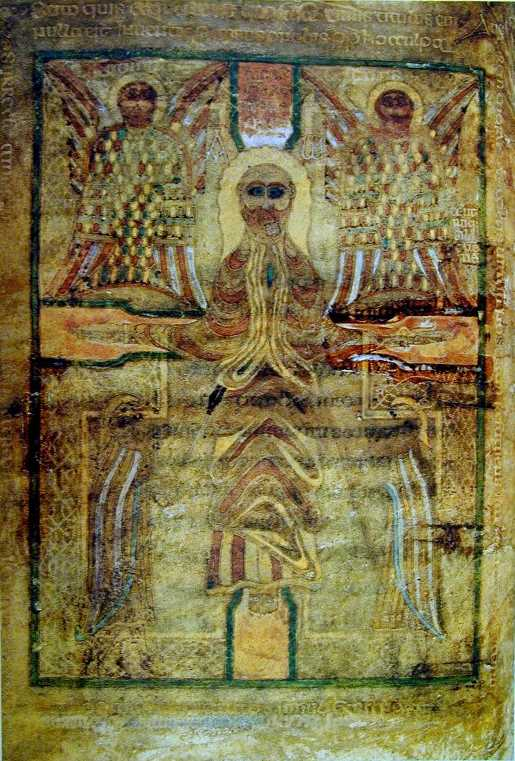
The Crucifixion from the Durham Gospels

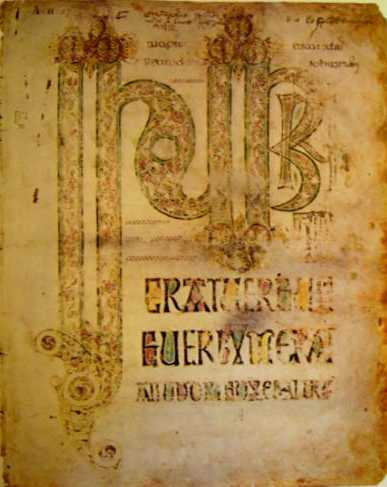
The Incipit page to the Gospel of John.

The Durham Gospels is a very incomplete late 7th-century insular Gospel Book, now kept in the Durham Cathedral Dean and Chapter Library (MS A.II.17). A single folio of this manuscript is now in Magdalene College, Cambridge (Pepysian MS 2981). Only two of the fully decorated pages survive: a Crucifixion (the oldest in English art) and the initial to John, and both of these are in poor condition. There were probably originally evangelist portraits and carpet pages, as in other Insular Gospel books conceived on a similar scale. The book was produced at Lindisfarne and brought to Durham when the monks of Lindisfarne removed to Durham because of Viking attacks. The Durham Gospels were written by the same scribe who wrote the Echternach Gospels, now in Paris.

The Durham Cathedral Library A. II. 10. Gospel Book Fragment is another manuscript (MS A.II.10) in the cathedral library which is sometimes referred to as the "Durham Gospels", but more usually as the "Durham Gospel Fragment".

The Durham Gospels are used at the Enthronement of each new Bishop of Durham, for the new Bishop to take his oath on. During this service, the most senior first King's Scholar from Durham School holds the Gospels for the Bishop to take his oath.
