= Teddy Howling =

English footballer

Personal information
- Full name: Edward Howling
- Date of birth: 1885
- Place of birth: Stockton-on-Tees, England
- Date of death: 1955 (aged 69–70)
- Height: 5 ft 11 in (1.80 m)
- Position: Goalkeeper

Senior career*
Years	Team	Apps	(Gls)
- South Bank St Peter's
- South Park
1910–1913	Middlesbrough	1	(0)
- South Park
1913–1914	Bristol City	55	(0)
1919–1920	Bradford (Park Avenue)	2	(0)
- Pontypridd

International career
1910–1912	England Amateurs	2	(0)
- * Club domestic league appearances and goals

Edward Howling (1885–1955) was an English professional footballer who played in the Football League for Bristol City and Middlesbrough as a goalkeeper. He was capped by England at amateur level.

== Personal life ==
Howling served in the British Armed Forces during the First World War.

== Career statistics ==
Appearances and goals by club, season and competition
Club	Season	League			FA Cup		Total	
Club	Season	Division	Apps	Goals	Apps	Goals	Apps	Goals
Middlesbrough	1910–11	First Division	1	0	0	0	1	0
Bristol City	1914–15	Second Division	37	0	2	0	39	0
Career total			38	0	2	0	40	0
