= Durham Dean and Chapter Library =

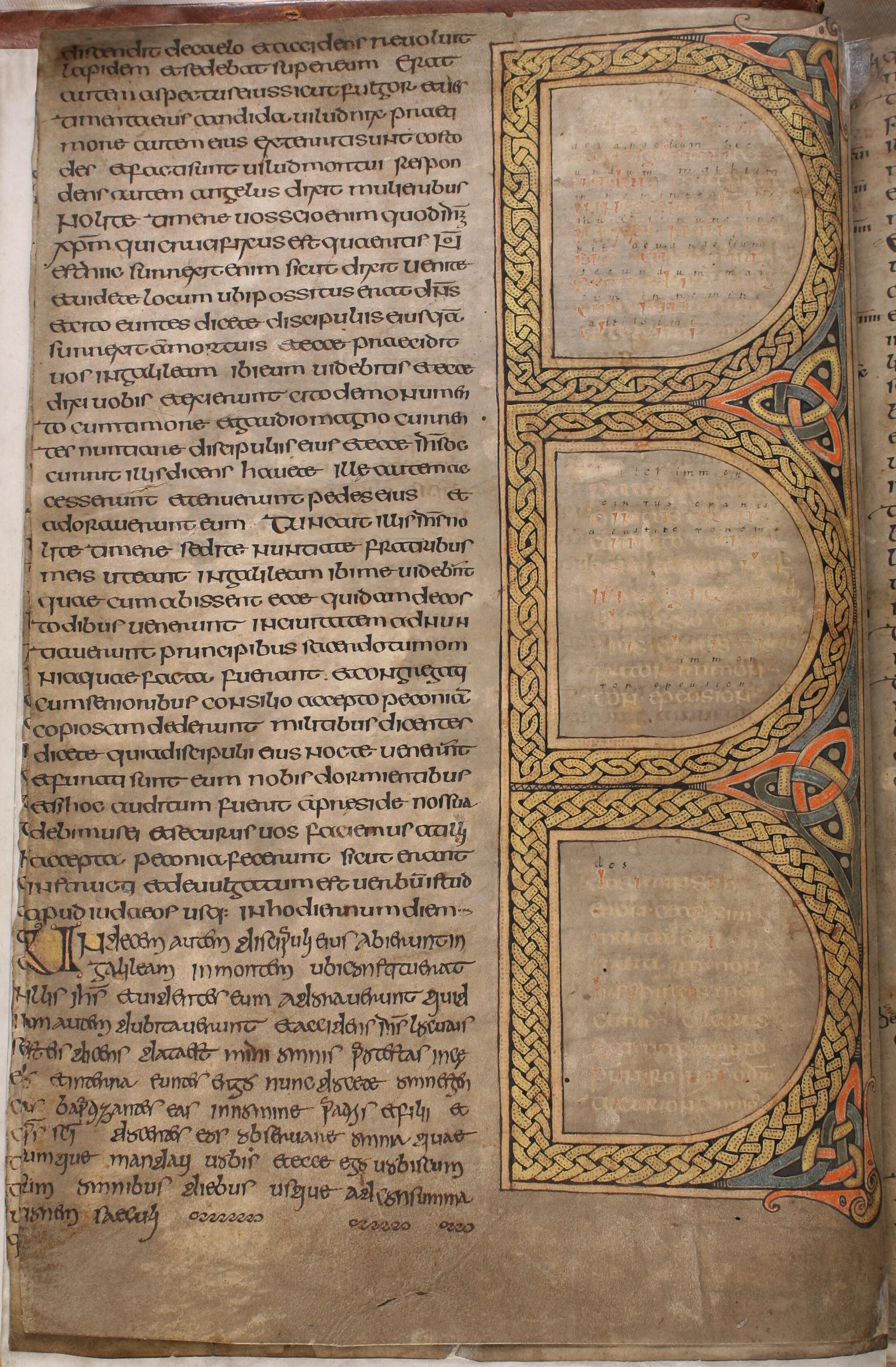
- Gospel Book Fragment (Durham Cathedral Library, A. II. 10.)
- 54.77333189686748°N 1.5756732695219298°W
- Location: Durham, England
- Established: 995

Other information
- Affiliation: Durham Cathedral
- Website: https://www.durhamcathedral.co.uk/explore/treasures-collections/cathedral-library

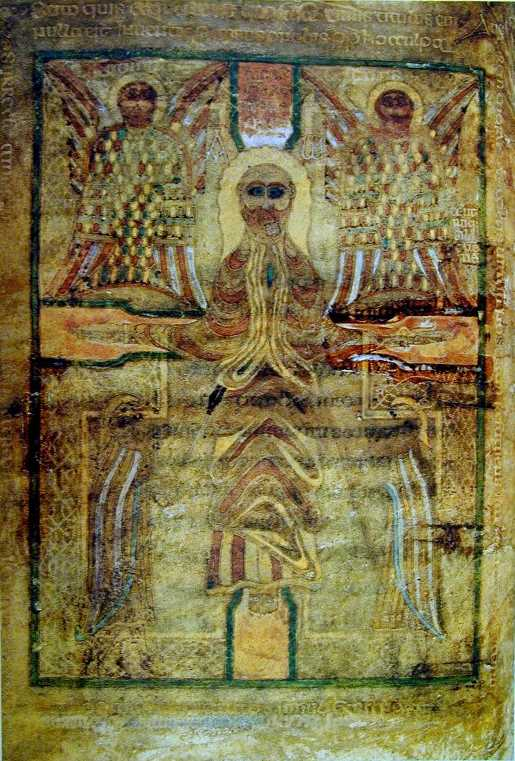
The Crucifixion from the Durham Gospels

The Durham Dean and Chapter Library, also known as Durham Cathedral Library, is located in Durham Cathedral, Durham, England. Founded in 995 AD, it is one of the largest English cathedral libraries. William de St-Calais donated 46 books. In the 19th century it was located in the Old Frater House, or Monk's Hall, on the south side of the cathedral's cloisters, situated there in 1680 by the Dean of Durham John Sudbury, who fitted up the building.

== Holdings ==
There are 75,000 volumes and 60 incunabula. Of the 2,000 manuscripts, 360 are of the medieval era. The special collections contain early music.

Christian writings

The Durham Gospels, a very incomplete late 7th century insular Gospel Book (MS A. II. 17), and the Durham Gospel Fragment, a very incomplete late 7th century insular Gospel Book, are part of the library's holdings.

There is also a copy of the Bible in four volumes, folio, which is 600 years old. A copy of a manuscript describing the life of St Catherine of Alexandria was located in the library in the 12th century.

History

Five history books by the Venerable Bede are in the library. The library houses three copies of the Magna Carta, including one dated 12 November 1216, and another dated 11 February 1224. The papers of George Allan, Christopher Hunter, Joseph Barber Lightfoot, James Raine, Ian Ramsey, Thomas Randall, Sir Cuthbert Sharp, and Robert Surtees are also part of the collections.
