= Gospel Book Fragment (Durham Cathedral Library, A. II. 10.) =

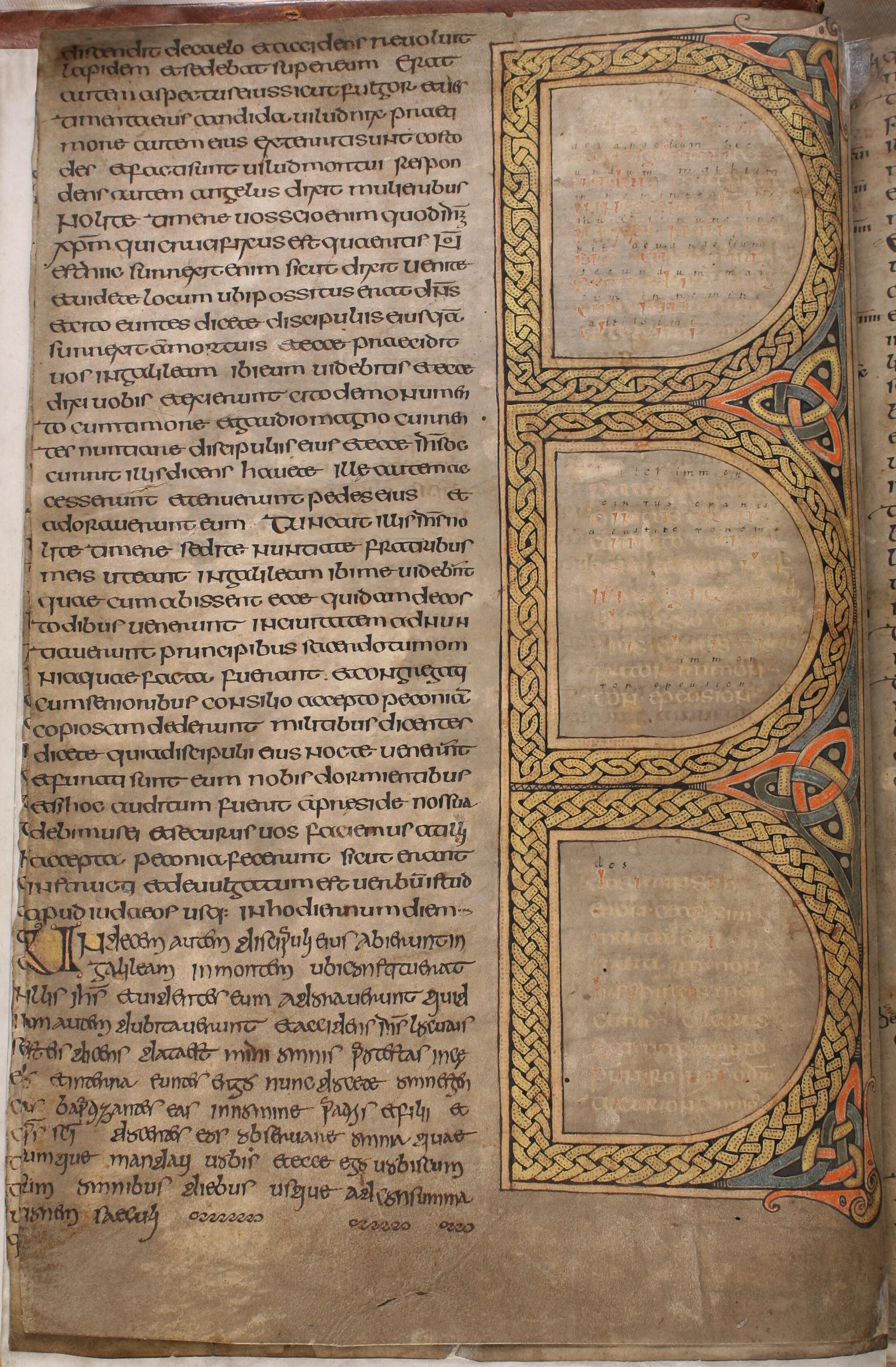
Folio 3v contains the colophon to the Gospel of Matthew from the Durham Gospel Fragment

Durham Cathedral Library, Manuscript A.II.10. is a fragmentary seventh-century Insular Gospel Book, produced in Lindisfarne c. 650. Only seven leaves of the book survive, bound in three separate volumes in the Durham Cathedral Dean and Chapter Library (MS A. II 10 ff. 2–5, 238-8a; MS C. III. 13, ff. 192–5; and MS C. III. 20, ff 1–2). Although this book is fragmentary, it is the earliest surviving example in the series of lavish Insular Gospel Books which includes the Book of Durrow, the Lindisfarne Gospels, the Lichfield Gospels and the Book of Kells.

The surviving illuminations are a border to the colophon at the end of the Gospel of Matthew and an "INI" monogram at the beginning of the Gospel of Mark.

The frame is in the form of three "D" shapes stacked one atop another and which occupy the entire right half of the page. The spaces between the curves of the "D" shapes are filled with triangular knots. The "D" shapes themselves are decorated orange dots superposed on yellow interlace patterns. The pattern of the interlace is different on each of the "D" shapes. This frame represents the first appearance in an Insular manuscript of interlace, a motif which will assume enormous importance in later manuscripts. The frame encloses the explicit for Matthew, the incipit for Mark, and the text of the pater noster in Greek, but written in Latin letters.

The "INI" monogram is formed by compressing the three letters into a large N which is reminiscent of the initial N found in the Ambrosiana Jerome. The left upright of the monogram is over twice as long as the right. Both uprights are divided into two columns of coloured panels separated by a black and cable. The panels are decorated with dots of contrasting colours. Both ends of the right upright and the top end of the left upright have spiral pattern terminals. The lower end of the left upright and both ends of the knotted cross bar have beast-head terminals. In the first line of text that follows the monogram, the letters are hollow-shafted and each successive letter is smaller than the previous. There are some smaller initials marking verses in Matthew.

This manuscript shows the beginning of many techniques and motifs that are used in later manuscripts. The use of decorated text in which the decoration distorts the shape of the letters has been seen before, notably in the Cathach of St. Columba. But the combination of letters into a monogram is a new motif, one that will be developed extensively in later manuscripts. Similar "INI" monograms will be used at the beginning of the Gospel of Mark in almost every later Insular Gospel Book. The use of alternating colours that almost resemble enamel plaques such as are seen in this manuscript's INI monogram will also become a standard technique in later manuscripts. The successive diminution of letters following an initial had also been seen, again notably in the Cathach, and would also be a standard technique in Insular illumination. Finally the interlace pattern first found here would become an almost defining aspect of Insular illumination.
