= Howl (American band) =

HOWL
- Origin: Providence, Rhode Island, U.S.
- Genres: Sludge metal
- Years active: 2006–present
- Labels: Relapse
- Members: Vincent Hausman; Jonathan Hall; Josh Durocher-Jones; Jesse Riley; Nick Kasten

Howl is an American sludge metal band from Providence, Rhode Island, formed in 2006. They released their debut album, Full of Hell, in May 2010.

== History ==
Howl signed with Relapse Records in 2009 and reissued their self-titled EP on July 21, 2009. It was favorably reviewed by Decibel magazine.

Howl worked with engineer Keith Souza to record their debut studio album, Full of Hell, in January 2010.

In February 2010, Howl supported Skeletonwitch on their Eastern United States tour. Later that year in March, Howl participated in the SXSW festival in Austin, Texas.

Decibel gave Full of Hell a favorable review in their May 2010 issue.

Howl took part in the 2011 Metalliance Tour, which also includes Helmet, Crowbar, Saint Vitus, Kylesa, and Red Fang.

In May 2011, Howl released the music video for their single "Heavenless" off their album Full of Hell. The video was directed by Charlie Scharfman and produced by Alex Scharfman of Scharfman Productions.

Howl's second album, Bloodlines, was released on Relapse Records, April 30, 2013 in North America.

== Band members ==
- Vincent Hausman – Guitar, Vocals
- Jonathan Hall – Guitar
- Josh Durocher-Jones – Guitar
- Jesse "Carl" Riley – Bass
- Nick Kasten – Drums

Former members:

- Andrea Black – Guitar
- Robert Icaza – Bass, Vocals
- Timmy St. Amour – Drums

== Discography ==
- Howl (2008)
- Full of Hell (2010)
- Bloodlines (2013)
