= Historia de Sancto Cuthberto =

- "History of St Cuthbert"
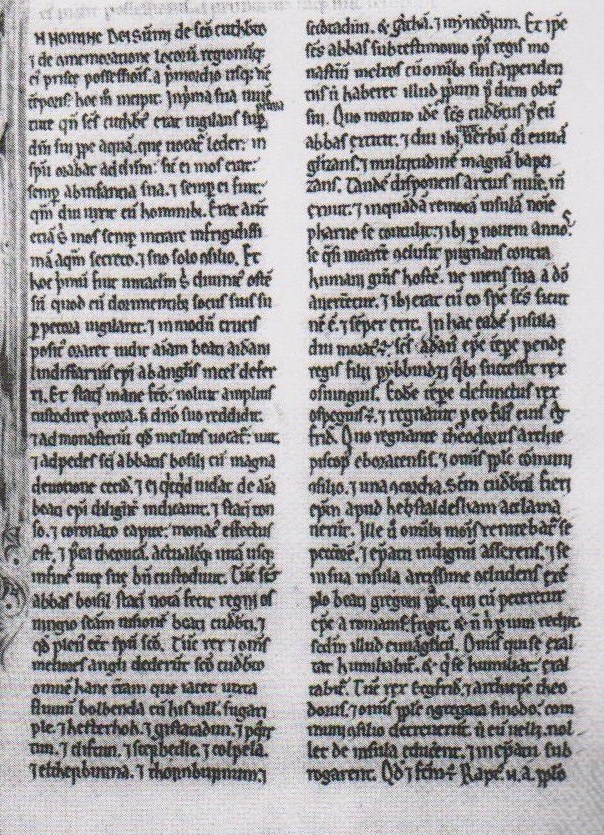
- The opening page of the Historia de Sancto Cuthberto in the Cambridge University Library Ff. 1.27 manuscript
- Full title: Historia de Sancto Cuthberto et de Commemoratione Locorum Regionumque Eius Priscae Possessionis, a Primordio usque Nunc Temporis
- Author(s): anonymous
- Patron: Bishopric of Durham
- Language: Latin
- Date: mid- to late-11th century
- Provenance: Durham Cathedral
- State of existence: three witnesses
- Manuscript(s): Oxford Bodleian Library, Bodley 596; Cambridge University Library, Ff. 1.27; Lincoln's Inn London Hale 114
- First printed edition: Roger Twysden, Historiae Anglicanae Scriptores X (1652)
- Genre: Chronicle cartulary
- Length: c. 6500 words
- Subject: St Cuthbert and the property of the church of St Cuthbert
- Period covered: 7th century to 1031
- Personages: St Cuthbert, Bishop Ecgred, Abbot Eadred, Cuthheard

Cuthbert's incorrupt body. 12th-century miniature from British Library Yates Thomson MS 26 version of Bede's prose Life of St Cuthbert

The Historia de Sancto Cuthberto ("History of St Cuthbert") is a historical compilation finished some time after 1031. It is an account of the history of the bishopric of St Cuthbert—based successively at Lindisfarne, Norham, Chester-le-Street and finally Durham—from the life of Saint Cuthbert himself onwards. The latest event documented is a grant by King Cnut, c. 1031. The work is a cartulary chronicle recording grants and losses of property as well as miracles of retribution, under a loose narrative of temporal progression. The text survives in three manuscripts, the earliest of which dates from around 1100. The original version of the text is not thought to be extant; rather, all surviving manuscripts are thought to be copies of an earlier but lost exemplar. The Historia is one of the sources for the histories produced at Durham in the early 12th century, particularly the Historia Regum and Symeon of Durham's Libellus de Exordio.

== Manuscripts ==
There are three manuscript witnesses for the Historia, now in Oxford, Cambridge and London, none of which attribute the text to any author. The earliest witness is believed to be the version in the Oxford manuscript, folios 203r to 206v of Oxford's Bodleian Library, MS "Bodley 596". The text is incomplete, beginning only in chapter 8, as the first folio has disappeared (along with the later folios of the text that preceded it in the manuscript, Bede's metrical Life of St Cuthbert). The handwriting is early Gothic, showing continental influences typical of the contemporary Anglo-Norman script. Palaeographer Michael Gullick has identified the scribe as Symeon of Durham (fl. 1093–1129), an identification accepted by the Historia's recent editor Ted Johnson South. Bodley 596 itself is a compilation bound together in the early 17th century, but folios 174 to 214 are from the late 11th or early 12th century, containing Bede's prose Life of St Cuthbert (175r–200v), his metrical Life of St Cuthbert (201r–202v), this Historia and finally a Life and Office of St Julian of Le Mans (206v–214v). The codicological details indicate that these works were part of one original volume, though it has been claimed that the Julian text is in a different hand.

The Cambridge version, in the manuscript known as Cambridge University Library, Ff. 1.27 ("Ff. 1.27"), is slightly later. Like the Oxford version, it is incomplete, missing chapters 29 to 34. The style of handwriting suggests that the text of the Cambridge Historia dates to the mid-12th century, though it may be as late as the early 13th century. It is written in a single hand classified as English early Gothic, typical of the period 1140–1170. Ff. 1.27 as a whole came together in the 15th century or later, but pages 1 to 236 are earlier and palaographic evidence suggests that, with the exception of a continuation of Gildas' De excidio Britanniae dating to the 14th century, share the same origin. The same kind of evidence implies that Ff. 1.27 1–236 had a common origin with half of the contents of another Cambridge manuscript, Corpus Christi College Cambridge MS. 66 ("CCCC 66"), also largely composed of Northumbrian material. It probably had a common origin with Corpus Christi College Cambridge MS. 139 ("CCCC 139") as well: the Historia of Ff. 1.27 is written in the same hand as part of CCCC 139's version of the Historia Regum (a Durham-based history of the English). This scribes behind this material may have been based at Sawley Abbey in Lancashire, though this is uncertain and Durham too is a possibility.

The London version is the most complete of the three, containing all chapters known in the others as well as one extra chapter, a colophon, chapter 34. It is written on folios 153r–159r of the manuscript classified as Lincoln's Inn London Hale 114 ("Hale 114"), the manuscript otherwise known as the "Red Book of Durham", which Durham lost possession of during the episcopate of Thomas Morton (1632–47). It probably comes from Durham, and is the latest of the three. Ted Johnson South described its style as "English Secretary Hand with Anglicana affinities"; it probably comes from the 15th century. The Historia comes after a second metrical Life of St Cuthbert (and the history of the bishopric) and before a chronicle of the bishopric of Lindisfarne from 625 to 847.

In the manuscript known as the British Library Cotton Claudius D. iv, there is a copy of the Libellus de exordio et Statu Cathedralis Dunelmensis, a history of the bishopric of Durham, with an appended selection of quotes from older texts, probably written by John Wessington, prior of Durham (1416–46). In both the body of the Libellus and as well as its appendix, passages identical to text of the Historia appear, on both occasions accompanied by marginal notes claiming that the text in question comes from the "prior's book". This may well be a fourth version of the text that is now lost. The notes remark that the source was a book on St Cuthbert written in extremely old writing.

== Modern editions ==
The Historia has been published four times. First in the 17th century, twice in the 19th century, and then once again in the 21st century:

- Twysden, Roger, ed. (1652). Historiae Anglicanae Scriptores X : Simeon Monachus Dunelmensis, Johannes Prior Hagustaldensis, Ricardus Prior Hagustaldensis, Ailredus Abbas Rievallensis, Radulphus de Diceto Londoniensis, Johannes Brompton Jornallensis, Gervasius Monachus Dorobornensis, Thomas Stubbs Dominicanus, Guilielmus Thorn Cantuariensis, Henricus Knighton Leicestrensis : Ex vetustis manuscriptis, nunc primùm in lucem editi. Typis Jacobi Flesher, sumptibus Cornelii Bee, apud quem prostant vonales in vico vulgò vocato Little Britaine.
- Hinde, John Hodgson, ed. (1868). Symeonis Dunelmensis Opera et Collectanea I. Publications of the Surtees Society; volume 51. Durham: Surtees Society/ Andrews and Co. pp. 138–52.
- Arnold, Thomas, ed. (1882–85). Symeonis Monachi Opera Omnia I. Rerum Britannicarum Medii Ævi Scriptores, or, Chronicles and Memorials of Great Britain and Ireland during the Middle Ages; vol. 75. London: Longman. pp. 196–214.
- South, Ted Johnson, ed. (2002). Historia de Sancto Cuthberto: A History of Saint Cuthbert and a Record of His Patrimony. Anglo-Saxon Texts No 3. Cambridge: D. S. Brewer. pp. 42–71.

The first printed version by Roger Twysden, which brought knowledge of the text to the wider world for the first time, utilised only the Cambridge version, thus missing chapters 29 to 34 and ending with the visit of King Edmund to St Cuthbert. John Hinde's 1868 version was able to use Oxford version as well as the Cambridge version, as antiquarian James Raine had recently rediscovered it. Even though Arnold's edition is later than Hinde's, Hinde's has usually been regarded as superior. Neither Hinde nor Thomas Arnold later in the century used the London version, which was only uncovered when Edmund Craster investigated the Red Book of Durham in the early 20th century . In 2001 a new edition with notes and a translation was released, the first to use the London version and to print the colophon.

The text was divided into 33 chapters by its 19th-century editor, Thomas Arnold. This form was largely retained by South, though South added the London colophon as chapter 34 while splitting chapter 19 into two.

== Date ==
It is believed that none of the three surviving versions of the text represent the original. It is further believed that no version was used as an exemplar for any other. All three carry distinct errors that are likely the result of copying from an earlier version in an Anglo-Caroline script that used Old English lettering like ash (Æ), wynn (ƿ), thorn (þ) and eth (ð) for proper names. Each version is however very similar to the others; aside from some minor spelling differences, the only major surviving discrepancy is where Ff. 1.27 and Hale 114 diverge for chapter three. South argued that these differences arose because of the Hale 114 scribe's tendency to tweak the text in conformity with the writings of Bede. South suggested that the lost "prior's book" contained the exemplar for all three versions, the original text itself.

Edmund Craster argued that the original Historia, or rather its "original core", was composed in the mid-10th century soon after the visit of King Edmund (c. 945). He argued that the text is best represented by Ff. 1.27, which ends at chapter 28, thus omitting material dealing directly with the period of Æthelred and Cnut. He theorised that chapters 29 to 32 were added in the 1030s, sometime after 1016, it was claimed, chapters 14–19½ along with chapter 33 were interpolated, a claim devised to explain the reference to the Battle of Assandun (1016) contained in chapter 16. Craster's arguments were criticised in the introduction to South's 2002 edition, where it was argued that the alleged Assandun interpolation was in fact an important part of the narrative, an argument earlier made by historian Luisella Simpson. South was inclined to date the narrative as a whole to the mid- or late 11th century, but adds that confidence can only come from further stylistic analysis. David Rollason, specialist in Durham history, has backed a similar date, though he does not suggest, like South, that the text was part of an Anglo-Norman revival in history writing. South also stressed that the Historia was a composite work, and that different passages used by the compiler probably do have earlier dates.

== Synopsis ==
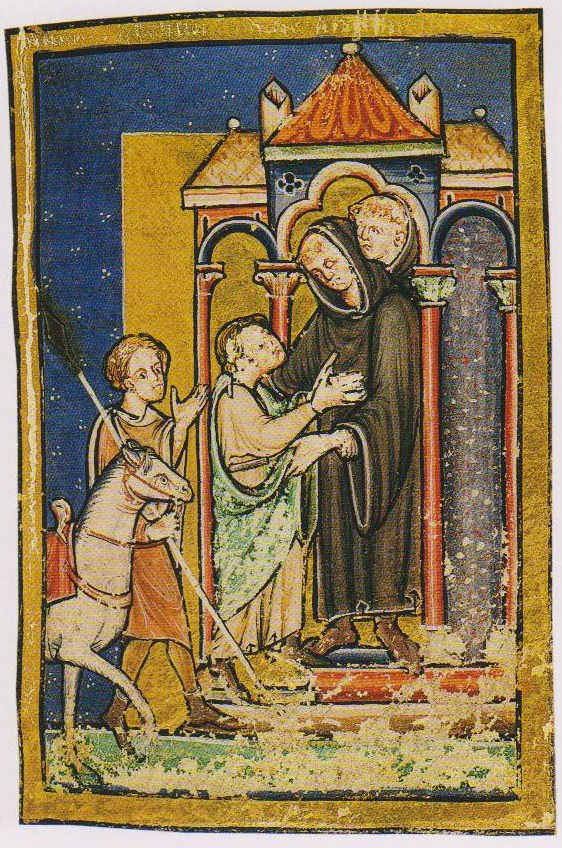
Cuthbert meets Boisil at Melrose monastery; 12th-century miniature from British Library Yates Thomson MS 26 version of Bede's prose Life of St Cuthbert

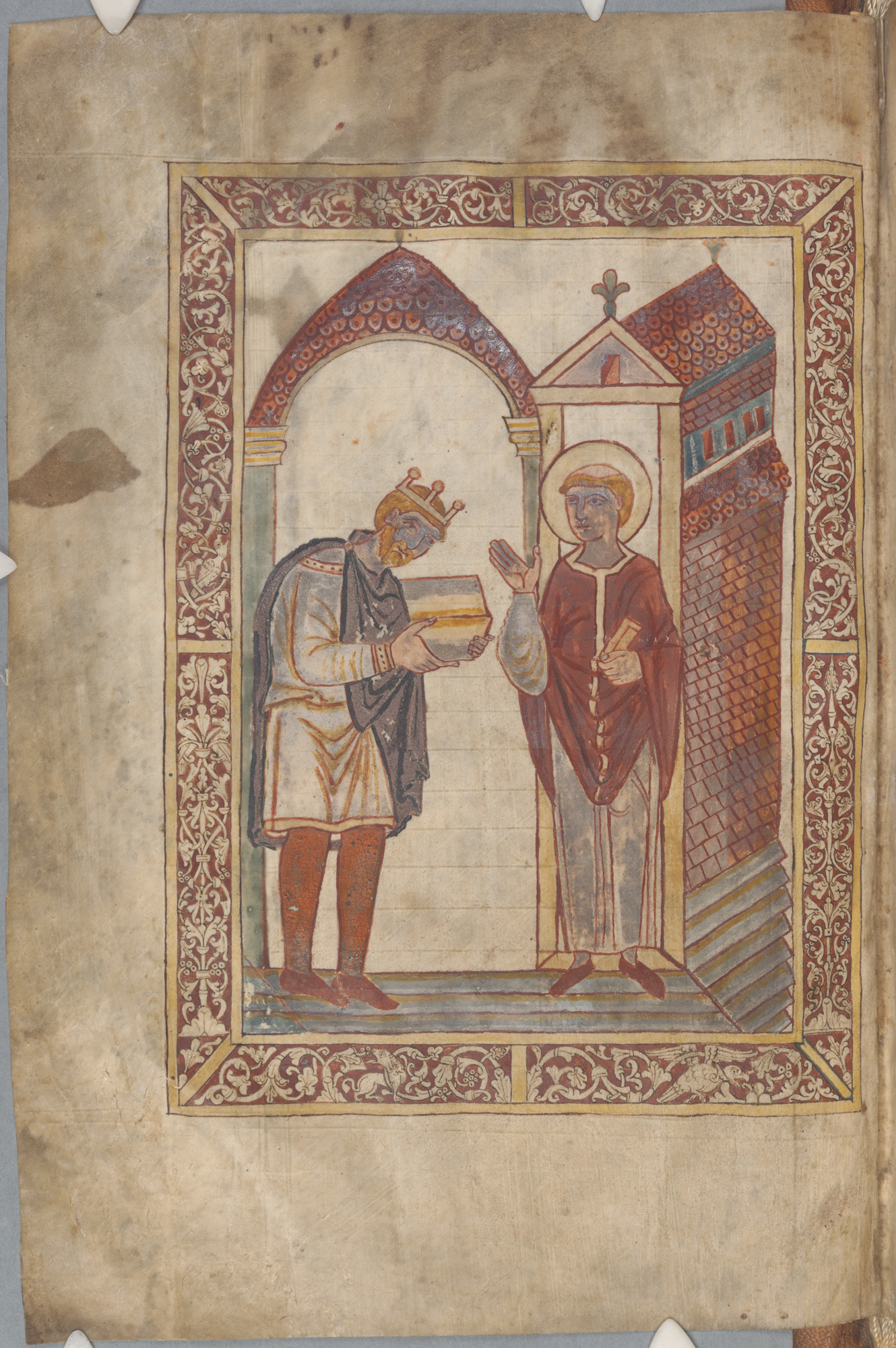
Æthelstan presenting a book to St Cuthbert (934); Corpus Christi College, Cambridge MS 183, fol. 1v

The Historia opens in chapter one with an introduction, followed in chapter two by an account of the youth of St Cuthbert at the river Leader, his vision of Áedán ascending to heaven, and his entrance to Melrose monastery under the tutelage of Boisil. Chapter three tells of the grant of 12 vills on and around the river Bowmont to Cuthbert by King Oswig and his magnates, of how Boisil gives Cuthbert Melrose and its dependent lands, and how Cuthbert himself becomes abbot of Melrose before becoming a hermit on Farne and then, finally, bishop of Lindisfarne. There follows a description of the diocese of Lindisfarne in chapter four, before the gift-giving resumes in chapter five with King Ecgfrith and Archbishop Theodore's grant of land in York, as well as Crayke; chapter four further relates how Cuthbert established a monastery and abbot at Crayke, with a nunnery, abbess and school at Carlisle (Luel) which he subsequently hands over to the abbot of Crayke. Chapter six carries the north-west theme further, describing how Cuthbert raised a boy from the dead at a vill named Exanforda, and how "King Ecgfrith and his Britons" donate Cartmel and Suthgedling, which the saint proceeds to hand over to an abbot named Cyneferth son of Cygincg. Chapter seven tells of King Ecgfrith's gift of Carham, while chapter eight records King Ceolwulf's presentation of the vill of Warkworth with its dependent land.

The following chapter gives an account of the episcopate of Bishop Ecgred, how he succeeds after Cuthbert's death, moves the seat of his bishopric to Norham, transporting the bodies of King Ceolwulf and St Cuthbert, and how he gives the bishopric Norham itself along with the vills of Jedburgh and Old Jedburgh and their dependent lands. Ecgred is said to have built a church at Gainford, likewise granting it to St Cuthbert, as well as making gifts of Cliffe, Wycliffe and Billingham The tables turn somewhat in chapter ten, which relates how King Osberht confiscated Warkworth and Tillmouth, and how King Ælle confiscated Cliffe, Wycliffe, and Billingham; but it proceeds to explain that God and Cuthbert got revenge by sending Ubba, duke of the Frisians (dux Fresciorum), to attack Northumbria. Before proceedings into this narrative, the Historia in chapter eleven notes the grant of King Ceolwulf and Bishop Esdred of the vills of Wudacestre, Whittingham, Edlingham and Eglingham.

The Scaldings slay Osberht and Ælle, as well as the "northern and southern English", in chapter twelve, while Halfdan king of the Danes sails up the river Tyne as far as Wircesforda plundering the land, inducing Cuthbert to punish him in turn with madness. Chapter thirteen has Abbot Eadred of Carlisle go across the Tyne to the Danes and get them to elect Guthred, "a slave of a certain widow", as king [of Northumbria]. Guthred consequently is made king on a hill named Oswigesdune, and the Viking host swears its peace and fidelity over the body of St Cuthbert, which Bishop Eardulf had brought for that purpose. In chapter fourteen the army of Ubba and Halfdan divides into three parts, settling in and around York, in Mercia, and among the southern Saxons, killing all the royals except Alfred the Great, who retreats into the marshes of Glastonbury low on provisions. In the following chapter (fifteen), Alfred is kind to a stranger who comes to him in need, ordering that he receive some of the remaining food. The stranger disappears and Alfred is rewarded with three boatloads of fish. Chapter sixteen has St Cuthbert visit Alfred during the night, revealing that he was the stranger, that he will be the defender of Alfred and his sons, and that Alfred and his sons are the chosen kings of all Britain. In the subsequent three chapters St Cuthbert's relationship to Alfred is compared with that of St Peter to King Edwin and of the Prophet Samuel to King David (chapter seventeen), Alfred's just character is celebrated (eighteen), and the king's donation, through his son Edward the Elder, of a golden thurible and two armlets, is recorded (nineteen).

Chapter nineteen also describes how Abbot Eadred [of Carlise] purchased the vills of Monk Hesleden, Horden Hall, Yoden, Castle Eden, Hulam, Hutton Henry and Twilingatun from King Guthred and made a gift of them to St Cuthbert. Following on from this, in chapter twenty Abbot Eadred and Bishop Eardulf travel with the body of St Cuthbert from Lindisfarne to the mouth of the river Derwent, where they attempt to sail to Ireland but are frustrated by a sea-storm created by the saint. Instead, they head to Crayke, and finally to Chester-le-Street where, after a seven-year journey, they settle. Newly settled in chapter twenty-one, Edward the Elder becomes king, and Cuthheard becomes bishop. Bishop Cuthheard buys Sedgefield and—excepting the lands held by Aculf, Æthelbriht and Frithlaf (over which the bishop has sake and soke)—all its dependent lands. The new bishop also buys Bedlington with its dependent lands between the rivers Wansbeck and Blyth. Meanwhile, Tilred abbot of Heversham gives half of Castle Eden to Cuthbert (and half to Norham in order to become abbot there) and Bernard the priest gives Twilingatun.

In chapter twenty-two Bishop Cuthheard grants Ælfred son of Brihtwulf—who had fled across the mountains from pirates— land lying between the Tees and Wear, centred on Easington, Castle Eden, Monk Hesledon and Billingham. Ælfred holds this until Ragnall ua Ímair occupies the territory of Ealdred son of Eadulf, following which Ealdred flees to Constantín mac Áeda in Scotland, leading to a battle where Ragnall defeats them in battle, killing all the English except Ealdred and his brother Uhtred. Ragnall gives the land between the Wear and the Tees to two of his followers in chapter twenty-three, Onlafbald and Scula, with Scula receiving the territory south of Eden Burn and Onlafbald the territory to the north. Onlafbald is said to have mocked St Cuthbert, and is thus punished with death. The narrative moves on in chapter twenty-four to describe how Wulfweard son of Hwetreddinc granted Benwell to St Cuthbert, and how Eadred son of Ricsige went across the mountains to kill Prince Eardwulf. Cuthheard subsequently grants Eadred son of Ricsige the land between Dere Street, the Derwent and the Wear, plus Gainford on the Tees, and Eadred is said to have held it until the time of Ragnall's invasion (after which it gets redistributed to his sons Esbrid and Ælstan).

Chapter twenty-five has the death of Edward the Elder, and the succession of Æthelstan. In chapter twenty-six Æthelstan leads an army to Scotland, and stops at the church of St Cuthbert, where he is said to have issued a charter. The charter is summarised as recording the grant of various movable goods, as well as much of the coastal land between the Wear and Eden Burn. In twenty-seven Æthelstan gives money to St Cuthbert, is thus successful in Scotland and reigns wisely for many years. In chapter twenty-eight Æthelstan dies, leading to the succession of Edmund. Edmund makes an expedition to Scotland, stopping at St Cuthbert's on the way.

After this there are four consecutive chapters recording or summarising the content of charters. Styr son of Ulf, grants land which he had bought around Darlington in chapter twenty-nine, Snaculf son of Cytel grants Bradbury, Mordon, Sockburn and Girsby in chapter thirty, Bishop Ealdhun grants land to earls Ethred, Northman and Uhtred in chapter thirty-one, while in chapter thirty-two Cnut grants Staindrop with its dependencies. Chapter thirty-three recounts a miracle whereby, after prayers by King Guthred, Cuthbert caused the earth to swallow up a Scottish army which had invaded and sacked the monastery of Lindisfarne. The Historia then closes with its colophon relating that, because of the miracle Guthred had issued a decree of protection for land given to St Cuthbert, and warning that anyone violating the protection and taking land from St Cuthbert will be damned.

== Influence ==
For the earlier portion of its narrative, the Historia demonstrably made use of three texts which have survived into the modern era. The Historia uses the Anonymous Life of St Cuthbert (written between 699 and 705), Bede's prose Life of St Cuthbert (written c. 721), and Bede's Historia ecclesiastica gentis Anglorum (written 731). The Historia, for instance, relates Cuthbert's vision on the river Leader, a story otherwise unique to the Anonymous Life; on the other hand, although the Anonymous Life has Cuthbert begin his monastic life at Ripon, the Historia follows Bede's Life instead and has him begin at Melrose. The Historia's account of the bishopric exchange with Eata is known only from Bede's Historia ecclesiastica, and in general Historia follows this source most of all. The Historia while using these sources sometimes got muddled, and sometimes has added unique information about Cuthbert, such as Cuthbert's habit of taking the shape of the cross while praying.

As far as the modern reader is concerned, much of the information later in the narrative is unique. Despite this, it is likely that the compiler was drawing on earlier sources. Monasteries in the 9th- and 10th-centuries had a habit of recording land grants in the margins or at the end of precious books, and much of the narrative consists of property grants probably derived from this kind of source. In a few instances this can be shown, such as the Æthelstan charter of chapter 27 which the author of the Historia contrived by adding two pieces of earlier marginalia written in Old English from King Æthelstan's Gospel and translating them into Latin as one document.

Material from the Historia became an important foundation of subsequent Durham historical texts during Durham's golden age of historical writing in the early 12th century. The earliest of these texts is probably the Cronica Monasterii Dunelmensis ("Chronicle of the monastery of Durham"), which incorporated and expanded several sections of the Historia's narrative, particularly the material relating to Guthred and the West Saxon kings. This work dates to the late 11th century and, while it no longer exists, can be reconstructed from later texts. The early-12th-century De Miraculis et Translationibus sancti Cuthberti ("On the Miracles and Translation of St Cuthbert") is possibly the next text. De Miraculis is a list of seven miracles performed by St Cuthbert, the first four of which are taken from the Historia, and expanded significantly with more complex prose, probably without the use of any other literary sources. These sources along with the Historia itself, were used in fashioning the Historia Regum and Symeon of Durham's Libellus de Exordio (as well as the Annales Lindisfarnenses et Dunelmenses).
