= Chronicle of 957 =

The Chronicle of 957 (sometimes called the Northern or Northumbrian Annals) is an anonymous Latin chronicle of Northumbria and the Kingdom of York covering the years 888–957. It is preserved in the manuscript Cambridge CCC 139 as a part of the 12th-century History of the Kings attributed to Symeon of Durham. There it functions as a continuation, after a long gap, of the Old Northumbrian Annals that cover the years 732–806 and some annals drawn from Asser's Life of Alfred for 849–887. The two Northumbrian chronicles are, however, entirely independent. The Chronicle of 957 is not contemporary with the events it describes, but was composed much later based on a now lost source (a set of Northumbrian annals or perhaps a unique Northumbrian recension of the Anglo-Saxon Chronicle). It ends with a note about the reign of Edward the Confessor (1042–1066).

The first two annals in the Chronicle, for the years 888 and 890, are translations from the Old English of the original Anglo-Saxon Chronicle. The annals for 893 and part of 894 are taken from the first continuation of the Anglo-Saxon Chronicle. They are derived from a manuscript which did not contain the errors of dating that crept into the surviving Anglo-Saxon manuscripts A, B, C and D. There is no further connection between the Chronicle of 957 and the first continuation, but there are several annals common to it and the Peterborough version of the Anglo-Saxon Chronicle. These are those for 899 (death of Alfred the Great), 906 (treaty of Yttingaford), 910 (battle of Tettenhall), 914, 919, 923, 927 and 933, although the dating sometimes differs in the Peterborough version. Before 934, the Chronicle of 957 contains information not found in the Anglo-Saxon Chronicle only for the years 892, 899, 900, 901, 902, 912, 920, 925 and 934. Some bits of information appear to be drawn from the Historia de Sancto Cuthberto. After 934, however, the entries are wholly independent of any version of the Anglo-Saxon Chronicle and are also much fuller. The full Chronicle of 957 may thus combine two shorter works, one also incorporated into the Peterborough chronicle and another one for 934–957 and not attested outside of the History of the Kings.

== Bibliography ==
- Angus, W. S. (1939–1940). "The Annals for the Tenth Century in Symeon of Durham's Historia Regum". The Durham University Journal. 32: 213–229.
- McGuigan, Neil (2015). Neither Scotland nor England: Middle Britain, c.850–1150 (PhD thesis). University of St Andrews.
- Rollason, David (2014). "Northern Annals". In Michael Lapidge; John Blair; Simon Keynes; Donald Scragg (eds.). The Wiley Blackwell Encyclopedia of Anglo-Saxon England. John Wiley & Sons. pp. 339–340.
- Westgard, Joshua A. (2016). "Northern Annals". In Graeme Dunphy; Cristian Bratu (eds.). Encyclopedia of the Medieval Chronicle. Brill Online.
