= Annals of Northumbria =

Annals of Northumbria may refer to:

- Northern Annals, a Latin chronicle covering the years 732–806
- Chronicle of 957, a Latin chronicle covering the years 888–957
