= Eadred Lulisc =

9th century abbot of Carlisle

Personal life
- Flourished: Late 9th century
- Known for: Abbot of Carlisle
- Other name: Eadred of Carlisle

Religious life
- Religion: Christian

Eadred Lulisc or Eadred of Carlisle (fl. late 9th century) is the abbot of Carlisle recorded by the Historia de Sancto Cuthberto. The Historia gives the abbot central place in the election of Guthred as king of Northumbria by the Viking army based in Yorkshire, and that subsequently Eadred purchased land from him, using it to endow the bishopric of St Cuthbert. The Historia also related that he and Eardwulf, Bishop of Lindisfarne, moved the body of St Cuthbert away from its previous base at Lindisfarne, tried to take it to Ireland, but failed and took it back to the east, first to Crayke and then to Chester-le-Street.

== Guthred and Eadred ==
The Historia chapter 13 claims that, prompted by a nighttime visit by St Cuthbert, Eadred crossed the river Tyne to the army of Danes based in Yorkshire, and instructed them to proclaim a boy named Guthred son of Harthacnut as king [of Northumbria], by placing a golden armlet on his right arm at a hill called Oswigesdune. It continues by relating that Abbot Eadred purchased from King Guthred the vills of Monk Hesleden, Horden Hall, Yoden, Castle Eden, Hulam, Hutton Henry, Twilingatun, and gave them over to the house of St Cuthbert.

== Cuthbert and Eadred ==
In chapter 20, Abbot Eadred and Eardwulf, Bishop of Lindisfarne, take the body of St Cuthbert away from Lindisfarne. After carrying the body around for seven years, they come to the mouth of the river Derwent hoping to cross to Ireland. Their plans being frustrated by the weather, they head back inland to Crayke, where they remain with Abbot Geve for four months. At this point in the narrative, Eadred disappears, but it is related that the body was moved to Chester-le-Street, around the time of the death of Alfred the Great (died 899) and Bishop Earwulf. The 12th-century text called the Libellus de exordio added that Ealdred only got involved in the body-moving after being summoned by Bishop Eardwulf. The same source, while repeating that he was abbot of Carlisle, says that he was educated there too.

The dates of these events are unclear. Although the Libellus, the Annales Lindisfarnenses and the Historia Regum place the departure from Lindisfarne in 875, with the arrival at Chester-le-Street in 883, such dates appear to have been added too late to be reliable. The date 875 links it to Halfdan's 875 invasion of Northumbria, a link made by later sources and modern historians; the Historia however, the earliest source, makes no such link.

Historian Ted Johnson South suggested that Eadred may not have been with the body on its departure from Lindisfarne, instead joining it at some point during its journey in the west. The figure of seven years is highly doubtful, like most of the narrative, and chapter 9 of the Historia confuses the issue by mentioning that the body had been at Norham for a while. Another historian, Alex Woolf, suggested that the see was at Chester-le-Street c. 880, but that it had previously been at Carlisle. Woolf argued that Eadred's prominence in the narrative and a property list from the Historia Regum combine to suggest that Carlisle was the location of a united Bernician bishopric for some years, having previously been at Norham.
