= John of Hexham =

Monk and chronicler (died 1209)

John of Hexham (c. 1160 – 1209) was an English chronicler, known to us merely as the author of a work called the Historia XXV. annorum, which continues the Historia regum attributed to Symeon of Durham, and contains an account of English events from 1130 to 1153.

From the title, as given in the only manuscript, we learn John's name and the fact that he was prior of Hexham. It must have been between 1160 and 1209 that he held this position; but the date at which he lived and wrote cannot be more accurately determined. Up to the year 1139 he follows closely the history written by his predecessor, Prior Richard; thenceforward he is an independent though not a very valuable authority. He is best informed as to the events of the north country; his want of care, when he ventures farther afield, may be illustrated by the fact that he places in 1145 King Stephen's siege of Oxford, which really occurred in 1142.

Even for northern affairs his chronology is faulty; from 1140 onwards his dates are uniformly one year too late. Prior Richard is not the only author to whom John is indebted; he incorporates in the annal of 1138 two other narratives of the Battle of the Standard, one in verse by the monk Serlo of Wilton, another in prose by Abbot Aelred of Rievaulx; and also a poem, by a Glasgow clerk, on the death of Somerled.

The one manuscript of John's chronicle is a late 12th-century copy; Cambridge, Corpus Christi College, MS 139. The best edition is that of Thomas Arnold in Symeonis monachi opera, vol. 2 (Rolls Series, 1885). There is an English translation in Joseph Stevenson's Church Historians of England, vol. 4 (London, 1856).
