= Northern Annals =

The Northern Annals, also called the York Annals, Old Northumbrian Annals or Annals of Alcuin, are a set of Latin annals from Northumbria covering the years from 732 until at least 806. No independent copy of the annals survives, but they have been partially reconstructed from later sources that incorporated or drew on them. Their authenticity is proved by their inclusion of material unlikely to have been invented by later chroniclers and astronomical observations that could only have been made by contemporaries.

The York Annals were a continuation of the annals contained in book V, chapter 24 of Bede's Ecclesiastical History of the English People, which covered the years from 60 BC to AD 731. Two lines of reasoning suggest that they were composed at York: the level of detail concerning that city and the connection of the later entries to Alcuin of York. The Latinity of the later entries bears some resemblance to Alcuin's style and the inclusion of continental material may be owed to Alcuin's continental connections.

The annals were produced in phases. The Moore manuscript of the Ecclesiastical History includes a continuation of the annals down to 734 drawn from an early draft of the York Annals. Later continuations of Ecclesiastical History known from the German family of manuscripts of the 12th-century and later cover the episcopate of Ecgbert of York from 732 to 766 based on the York Annals. About the same time, material from the York Annals entered the northern version of the Anglo-Saxon Chronicle. The version of the annals completed in 806 was used by Symeon of Durham in his History of the Church of Durham and in the History of the Kings in the 1120s. The anonymous History of the Saxons and Angles after the Death of Bede, preserved by Roger of Howden, who copied it into his history, and the Chronicle of Melrose also contain material from the York Annals.

There is no evidence that the York Annals were continued past 806, although Roger of Wendover's Flowers of History contains some later annals of dubious authenticity. The name "Northern" or "Northumbrian Annals" is sometimes also used for a set of annals of the years 888–957 preserved alongside the York Annals in the manuscript Cambridge CCC 139 of the History of the Kings.

== Bibliography ==
- Rollason, David (2014). "Northern Annals". In Michael Lapidge; John Blair; Simon Keynes; Donald Scragg (eds.). The Wiley Blackwell Encyclopedia of Anglo-Saxon England. John Wiley & Sons. pp. 339–340.
- Stafford, Pauline (2020). After Alfred: Anglo-Saxon Chronicles and Chroniclers, 900–1150. Oxford University Press. doi:10.1093/oso/9780198859642.001.0001. ISBN 978-0-19-885964-2.
- Westgard, Joshua A. (2016). "Northern Annals". In Graeme Dunphy; Cristian Bratu (eds.). Encyclopedia of the Medieval Chronicle. Brill Online. doi:10.1163/2213-2139_emc_SIM_01125.
