= 854 =

Calendar year

854 in various calendars
Gregorian calendar	854; DCCCLIV
Ab urbe condita	1607
Armenian calendar	303; ԹՎ ՅԳ
Assyrian calendar	5604
Balinese saka calendar	775–776
Bengali calendar	260–261
Berber calendar	1804
Buddhist calendar	1398
Burmese calendar	216
Byzantine calendar	6362–6363
Chinese calendar	癸酉年 (Water Rooster); 3551 or 3344 — to — 甲戌年 (Wood Dog); 3552 or 3345
Coptic calendar	570–571
Discordian calendar	2020
Ethiopian calendar	846–847
Hebrew calendar	4614–4615
- Hindu calendars
Vikram Samvat	910–911
Shaka Samvat	775–776
Kali Yuga	3954–3955
Holocene calendar	10854
Iranian calendar	232–233
Islamic calendar	239–240
Japanese calendar	Ninju 4 / Saikō 1 (斉衡元年)
Javanese calendar	751–752
Julian calendar	854; DCCCLIV
Korean calendar	3187
Minguo calendar	1058 before ROC 民前1058年
Nanakshahi calendar	−614
Seleucid era	1165/1166 AG
Thai solar calendar	1396–1397
Tibetan calendar	ཆུ་མོ་བྱ་ལོ་ (female Water-Bird); 980 or 599 or −173 — to — ཤིང་ཕོ་ཁྱི་ལོ་ (male Wood-Dog); 981 or 600 or −172

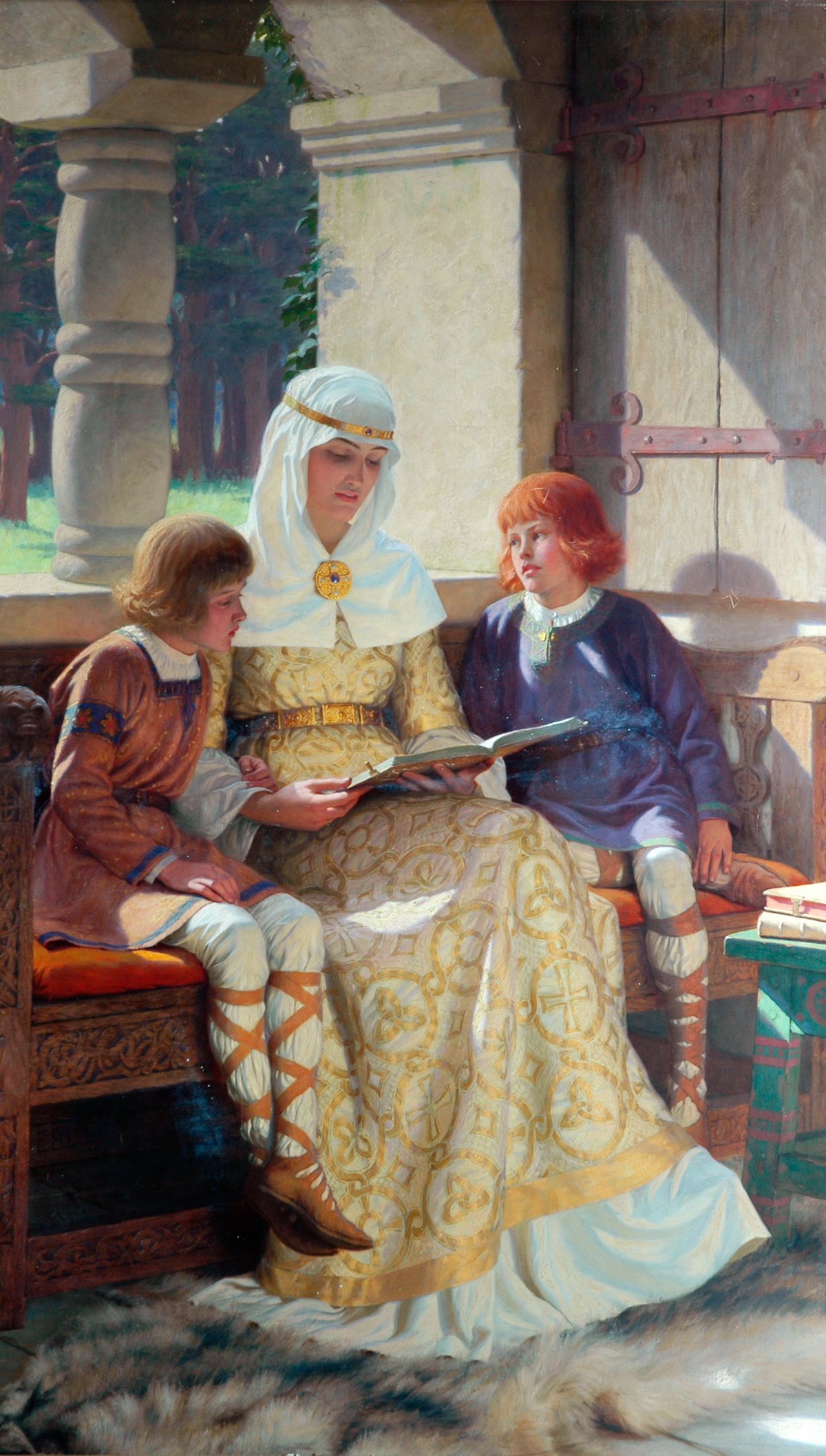
Queen Osburh reading to her sons Alfred and Æthelred during their boyhood (1913)

Year 854 (DCCCLIV) was a common year starting on Monday of the Julian calendar.

== Events ==
=== By place ===
==== Europe ====
- Emperor Lothair I meets his (half) brothers (Louis the German and Charles the Bald) in Attigny, Ardennes for the third time, to continue the system of "con-fraternal government".
- Viking chieftains Rorik and Godfrid Haraldsson return to Denmark, to gain power after the death of King Horik I. During a civil war, they are forced to go back to Friesland.
- The German city of Ulm is first mentioned, in a document by Louis the German.
- Croatian–Bulgarian battle: Bulgarian Khan (later Knyaz) Boris I, attacks the Duchy of Littoral Croatia, ruled by Duke Trpimir I during the First Croatian-Bulgarian War. It is fought on the Croatian territory in the vicinity of the Croatian–Bulgarian border in present-day northeastern Bosnia and Herzegovina. None of the warring sides emerges victorious, Bulgarian forces retreat and finally both parties subsequently conclude a peace treaty.

==== Britain ====
- King Æthelwulf of Wessex sends his two youngest sons, Alfred and Æthelred, on a pilgrimage to Rome.
- King Æthelweard of East Anglia dies, and is succeeded by his 14-year-old son Edmund ("the Martyr").
- King Cyngen of Powys makes the first pilgrimage to Rome of a Welsh ruler.
- Viking chieftain Ubba winters in Milford Haven (Wales) with 23 ships.

=== By topic ===
==== Religion ====
- Eardulf becomes bishop of Lindisfarne, after the death of Eanbert.

== Births ==
- Al-Mu'tadid, Muslim caliph (or 861)
- Cadell ap Rhodri, king of Seisyllwg (d. 909)
- Cui Yin, chancellor of the Tang Dynasty (d. 904)
- Theobald the Elder, Frankish nobleman (d. 942)

== Deaths ==
- Abu Thawr, Muslim scholar (b. 764)
- Æthelweard, king of East Anglia
- Eanbert, bishop of Lindisfarne
- Horik I, Viking king of Denmark
- Liudger, bishop of Utrecht (approximate date)
- Osburh, queen of Wessex (approximate date)
- Sahnun ibn Sa'id, Muslim jurist (or 855)
- Túathal mac Máele-Brigte, king of Leinster
- Wang Yuankui, Chinese general (b. 812)
- Wigmund, archbishop of York
