= Watton Priory =

Priory in the East Riding of Yorkshire, England

Coordinates: 53.9342°N 0.4426°W

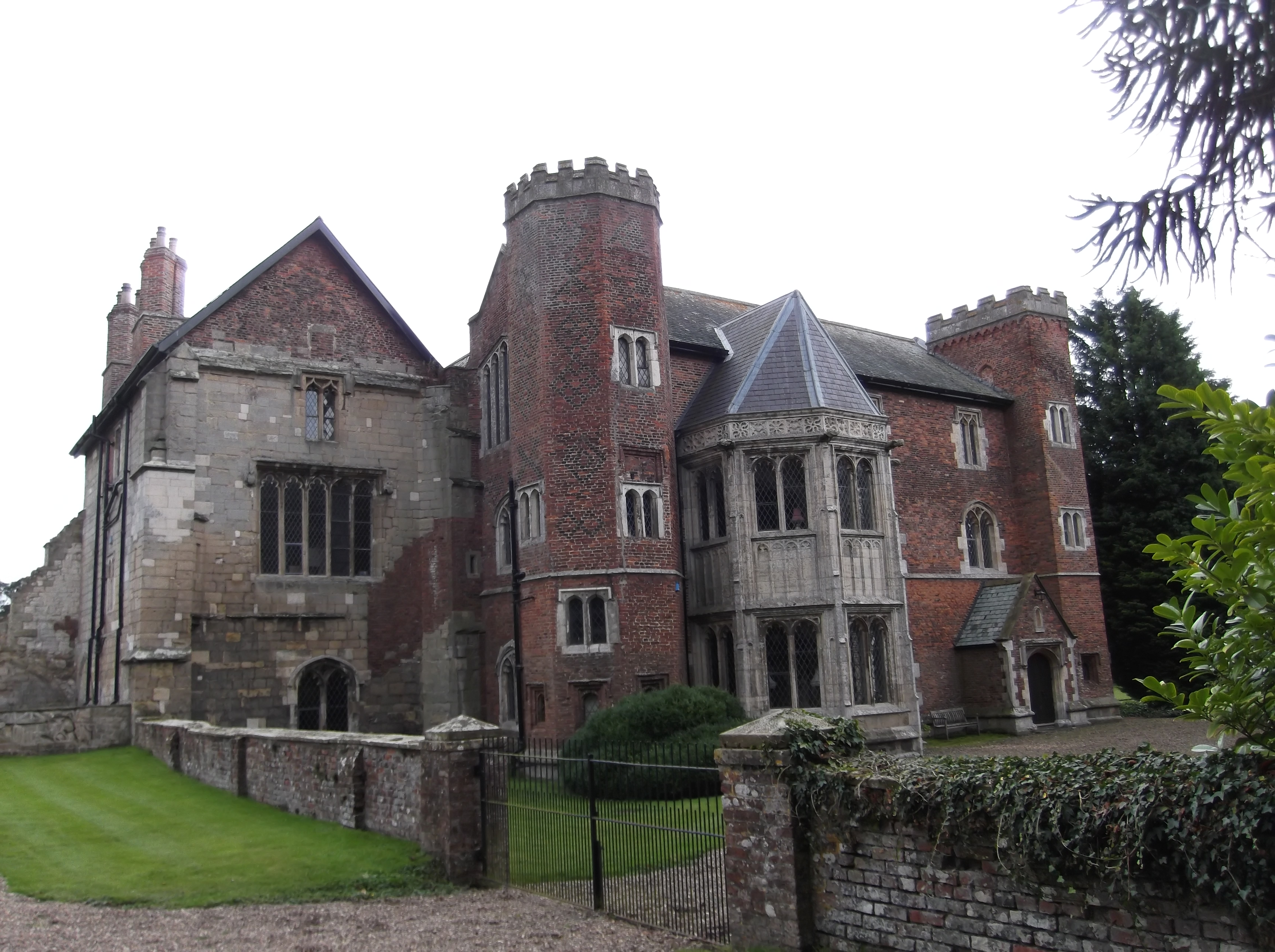
Watton Abbey

Watton Priory was a priory of the Gilbertine Order at Watton in the East Riding of Yorkshire, England. It is a Grade I listed building.

== History ==
The double monastery was founded in 1150 by Eustace fitz John and his wife, Agnes fitz Nigel, daughter of William fitz Nigel, constable of Chester. It was built on land that Eustace held of Lord William Fossard, a Yorkshire tenant-in-chief who is sometimes identified as the founder. Certainly Fossard is known to have gifted to the priory substantial lands in the city of York and in Hawold.

The site chosen for the priory had once been the location of an Anglo-Saxon nunnery mentioned by the Venerable Bede.

Surviving today, to the southeast of the cloister is a group of buildings constructed in the thirteenth, fourteenth, and fifteenth centuries, which are thought to have formed a chief part of the infirmary as well as the prior’s lodgings. The fifteenth-century building included a great hall with a beautiful oriel window. Also still standing, to the north of the priory is the great brick barn of the fifteenth century, recently repaired by Natural England and Historic England. The environs of the priory were surrounded by a moat.

There were 140 religious at Watton (70 brothers and 70 sisters). Unlike most other Gilbertine convents, Watton was one of three still operating as a double monastery until the Dissolution in 1539.

Records about expenses suggest that both the men and the women at Watton were relatively well off. Each canon had three tunics, a lambskin coat, a furred white cloak and a hood lined with lambskin, two pairs of stockings, a pair of woolen socks, day shoes of red leather, night slippers, a linen cloak, and a white scapular. Each nun had five tunics (three for work and two for prayer and recreation) and a scapular for "labor of the sterner sort." The women wore black linen caps, lambskin coats, and black veils, and if they chose, they were allowed a shift of coarse cloth.

In the thirteenth century, Watton was bothered by the considerable turmoil being stirred up by wealthy noble widows who, with their marauding supporters, were wreaking havoc in Yorkshire, committing acts of kidnapping, assault, cattle rustling, animal abuse, and theft. For rest from their forays, they would impose on the hospitality of the Gilbertine nuns at Watton and elsewhere, notably Malton Priory, bringing “disrepute upon their hostesses by behaviour more suited to the world than to the cloister.” Historian Eileen Power summed it up this way: “The fact was that no one had any real control over these great ladies least of all their hostesses.”

In 1272 Henry III wrote to the sheriff of Yorkshire about Agnes de Vescy, widow of William de Vescy, who “has been to the house of Watton with a great number of women and dogs and other things, which have interfered with the devotions of the nuns and sisters.” Since the Gilbertines were under special protection, the king “bade the sheriff go in person to Agnes de Vescy, and warn her not to go to Watton or any other house without special leave from the Master of the Order, and not to trouble the nuns any further: if she would not hear the sheriff, he must prevent her from going. Henry himself sent her a letter of warning.”

In 1320, the priory of Watton received from King Edward II buildings and a plot of land in Scarborough in exchange for which the Blackfriars of Scarborough received land that Watton had held of the king.

Though the priory was financially destitute in 1444, by the time of the Dissolution in the sixteenth century, Watton was one of the largest and wealthiest houses of the order. Its annual value was £360 (about £152,000 today). The surrender to the Crown was signed by the prior, ten canons, the prioress, and several of the nuns.

In 1306, King Edward I of England imprisoned the twelve-year-old Scottish princess Marjorie Bruce at Watton after her capture after the Battle of Methven, the king commanding the sheriff of York in 1307 “by view of the Prior of Wattone, to allow Margery, daughter of Robert de Brus, staying in Wattone by the K.’s order, 3d. a day for her expenses, from the morrow of All Souls last year when she came there; and a mark yearly for her dress.” She was not released until 1314 in the reign of Edward II.

The Nun of Watton was the protagonist of events, recorded by St Ailred of Rievaulx in De Sanctimoniali de Wattun. The nun had been admitted to the holy life as a toddler but the young woman was unsuited to the enforced celibacy of the life of a nun and became pregnant by a lay brother in the attached male community.

== Burials ==
- William de Vesci (d.1253)
- Gilbert d'Aton (d. 1350)

== See also ==
- Grade I listed buildings in the East Riding of Yorkshire
- Listed buildings in Watton, East Riding of Yorkshire
