= Watton, East Riding of Yorkshire =

Village and civil parish in the East Riding of Yorkshire, England

Coordinates: 53.937501°N 0.453516°W

Watton
- Location within the East Riding of Yorkshire
- Population: 259 (2011 census)
- OS grid reference: TA016501
- Civil parish: Watton
- Unitary authority: East Riding of Yorkshire
- Ceremonial county: East Riding of Yorkshire
- Region: Yorkshire and the Humber
- Country: England
- Sovereign state: United Kingdom
- Post town: DRIFFIELD
- Postcode district: YO25
- Dialling code: 01377
- Police: Humberside
- Fire: Humberside
- Ambulance: Yorkshire
- UK Parliament: Bridlington and The Wolds

Watton is a village and civil parish in the East Riding of Yorkshire, England. The village is situated on the A164 road, about 6 miles (9.7 km) north of Beverley and 6 miles (9.7 km) south of Driffield.

According to the 2011 UK census the civil parish of Watton had a population of 259, an increase on the 2001 UK census figure of 238.

== History ==
In the 6th century Watton was home to a Frankish saint, Monegunda of Watton (though perhaps this refers to a less direct connection with St Monegundis) and in the 13th century to William de Malton, master-mason who built Beverley Minster was buried here. The Venerable Bede in his Ecclesiastical History of the English People tells of a miracle of Saint John of Beverley that took place in Watton. It is also the setting for the 12th-century miracle story De Sanctimoniali de Wattun.

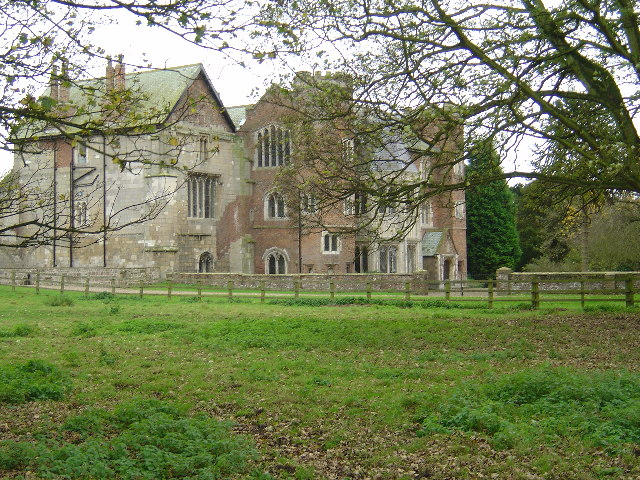
Watton Abbey

Watton is the location for Watton Priory which was a Gilbertine double monastery founded in 1150 by Eustace fitz John. The present building dates mainly from the 14th and 15th centuries, although it has earlier origins, and a house was added in the 19th century. It is a Grade I listed building. The priory was dissolved in 1539 by Henry VIII. The Nun of Watton, famous from Ailred of Rievaulx's De Sanctimoniali de Wattun, is noted for her pregnancy while in the priory.

Near to the priory is the Church of St Mary which was designated a Grade I listed building in September 1966 and is now recorded in the National Heritage List for England, maintained by Historic England. The church building is primarily of 15th century construction but some 13th century materials remain, while the south porch, and north vestry are dated 1859. The parapet to tower is 20th century.

== Etymology ==
The origin of the word Watton is uncertain, but suggestions include:

- Old English wád, or woad, and ton meaning small farming settlement; or
- waden meaning ford; or from waétan meaning watery.

== See also ==
- Listed buildings in Watton, East Riding of Yorkshire
