= Gsmp =

The letters GSMP may stand for:

- Global standards management process - a system of standards used in international trade
- Ordo Sancti Gilberti Sempringensis (Gilbertines) - an English Catholic religious order
