= Menologium =

Works organized by days of the month

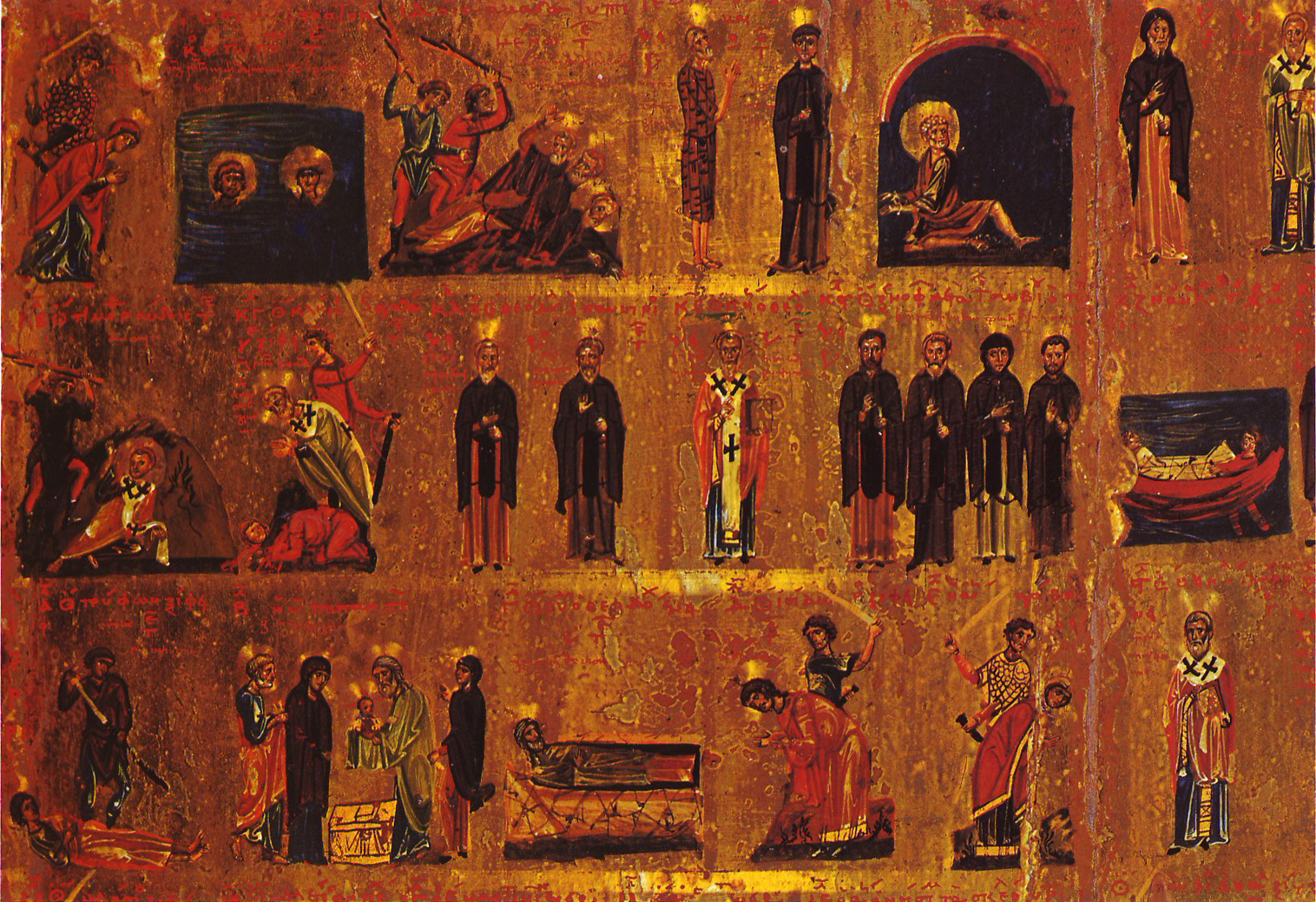
Detail of Menologium, showing saints and martyrs of December, January and February, painted by John Tohabi, 11th century tetraptych, kept at the Saint Catherine's Monastery.

A menologium (/mɛnəˈloʊdʒiəm/, pl. menologia), also known by other names, is any collection of information arranged according to the days of a month, usually a set of such collections for all the months of the year. In particular, it is used for ancient Roman farmers' almanacs (menologia rustica); for the untitled Old English poem on the Julian calendar that appears in a manuscript of the Anglo-Saxon Chronicle; for the liturgical books (also known as the menaia) used by the Eastern Orthodox Church and Eastern Catholic Churches following the Byzantine Rite that list the propers for fixed dates, typically in twelve volumes covering a month each and largely concerned with saints; for hagiographies (also known as synaxaria) and liturgical calendars written as part of this tradition; and for equivalents of these works among Roman Catholic religious orders for organized but private commemoration of their notable members.

== Name ==
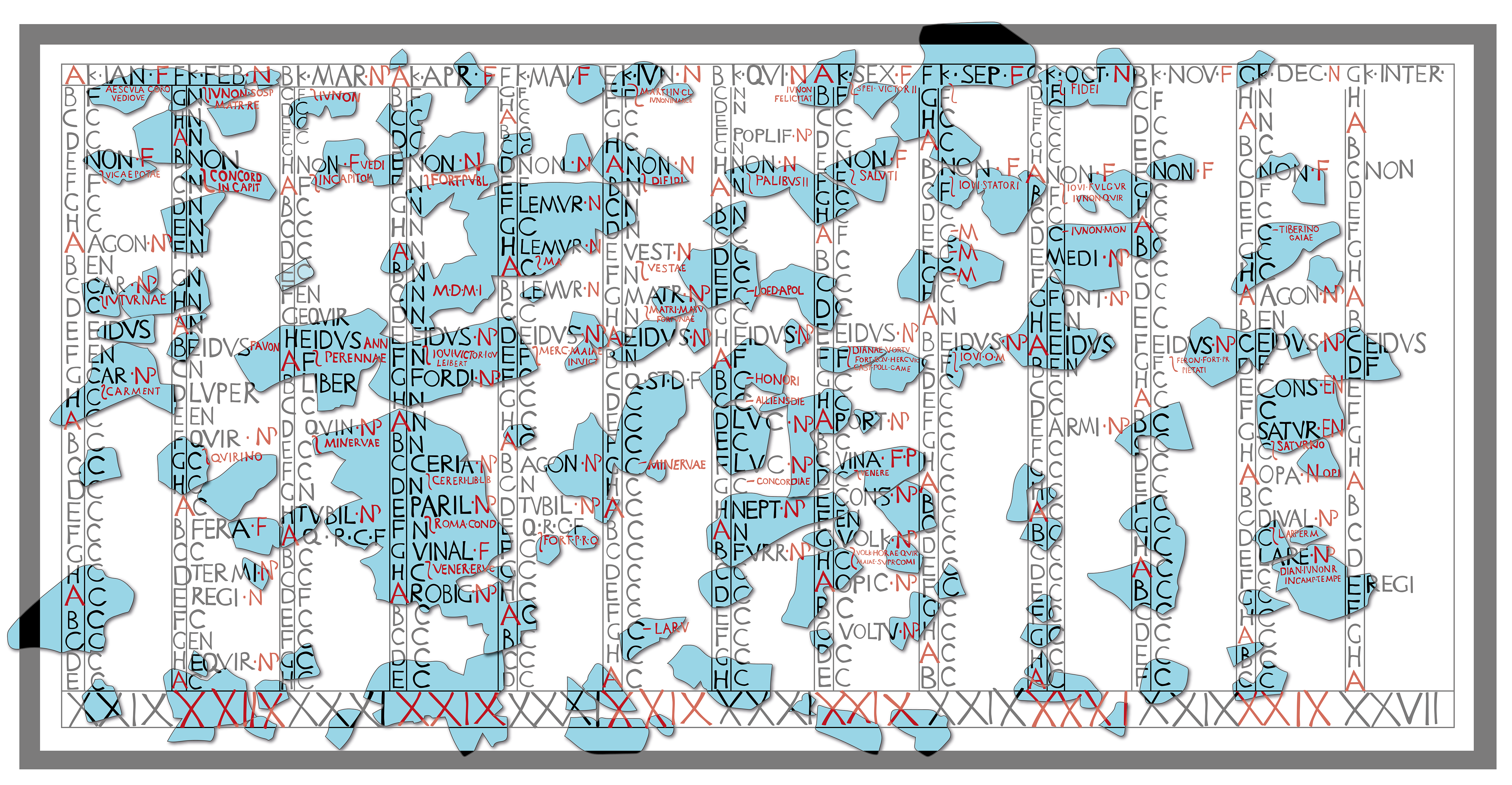
A reconstruction of the Roman calendar known as the Fasti Antiates Maiores

Menologium is the Latin form of Greek menologion (μηνολόγιον, menológion), which is also used in English, particularly in the context of Eastern Orthodoxy. The plural of both the Latin and Greek forms of the name is menologia. The Greek term derived from mḗn (μήν, "month") + -o- (-ο-) + lógos (λόγος, "writing, recording") + -ion (-ιον), together meaning a monthly record or account. Although properly referring to the thing recorded, menology is sometimes used as a synonym to mean the menologium itself. More rarely, menologe is as well, borrowed from French ménologe.

== Historical ==
=== Roman almanacs ===
The ancient Roman farming menologia (Latin: menologia rustica) were given their name by Theodor Mommsen in the first volume of the Corpus Inscriptionum Latinarum, date from the imperial period, and seem to derive from a single source, now lost. They provide the average lengths of day and night for each month at the latitude of Rome, astrological notes, the month's tutelary deity and temples in Rome by their day of dedication, agricultural tasks within the month, and other information but they omit most of the important agricultural festivals and, based on the listed harvest dates, were originally intended for a location rather north of Rome.

=== Old English poem ===
The Menologium, also known as the Old English Metrical Calendar, is an untitled late 10th-century Old English poem covering the Anglo-Saxon liturgical year within the context of the Anglo-Saxon Church's Julian calendar. Hart tentatively identifies its author as Byrhtferth, a Benedictine monk at Ramsey Abbey in Cambridgeshire, England. The Menologium serves as an prologue to a manuscript of the Anglo-Saxon Chronicle, introducing the year. There are similar but distinct equivalents in documents from the Celtic Church and in other Anglo-Saxon texts, generally known as kalendars. It has been printed in 18 separate editions beginning with George Hickes in 1703. Hickes entitled the poem "A Calendar or Poetical Menologium" (Calendarium seu Menologium Poeticum), picked up by Samuel Fox and the probable origin of its usual name. Most editions to date have added various emendations of the preserved text and several include misspellings and other errors, including in one instance changing summer to winter.

The Old English poem has also been edited to digital facsimiles of its manuscript folios, with annotations and a modern translation: Foys, Martin et al. (eds.).Old English Poetry in Facsimile Project. Center for the History of Print and Digital Culture, University of Wisconsin-Madison, 2019-)

== Eastern Orthodoxy ==
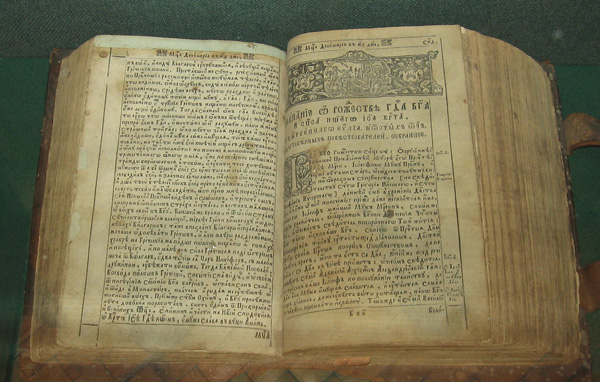
Dimitry of Rostov's Great Menaion Reader, printed in Kiev, 1714. The book is open at December 25, the Nativity of the Lord.

=== Menaia ===
Menaia, also known as menologia, are the office books of the Orthodox Church covering the propers assigned to fixed dates in the calendar. They correspond with the Proprium Sanctorum of the Roman Catholic Breviary. They are usually issued in sets of 12 volumes, one for each month of the year, but are sometimes bound in three, each covering four months together. The propers cover the part of the day's liturgy that varies from the usual ordinary. They thus cover the commemoration of the days' saints in the service and in the canons sung at Orthros, particularly the synaxaries. These lives of the saints are inserted between the 6th and 7th odes of the canon in similar fashion to the interpolation of the day's Martyrologium into the choral recitation of Prime in Roman Catholicism.

=== Synaxaria ===
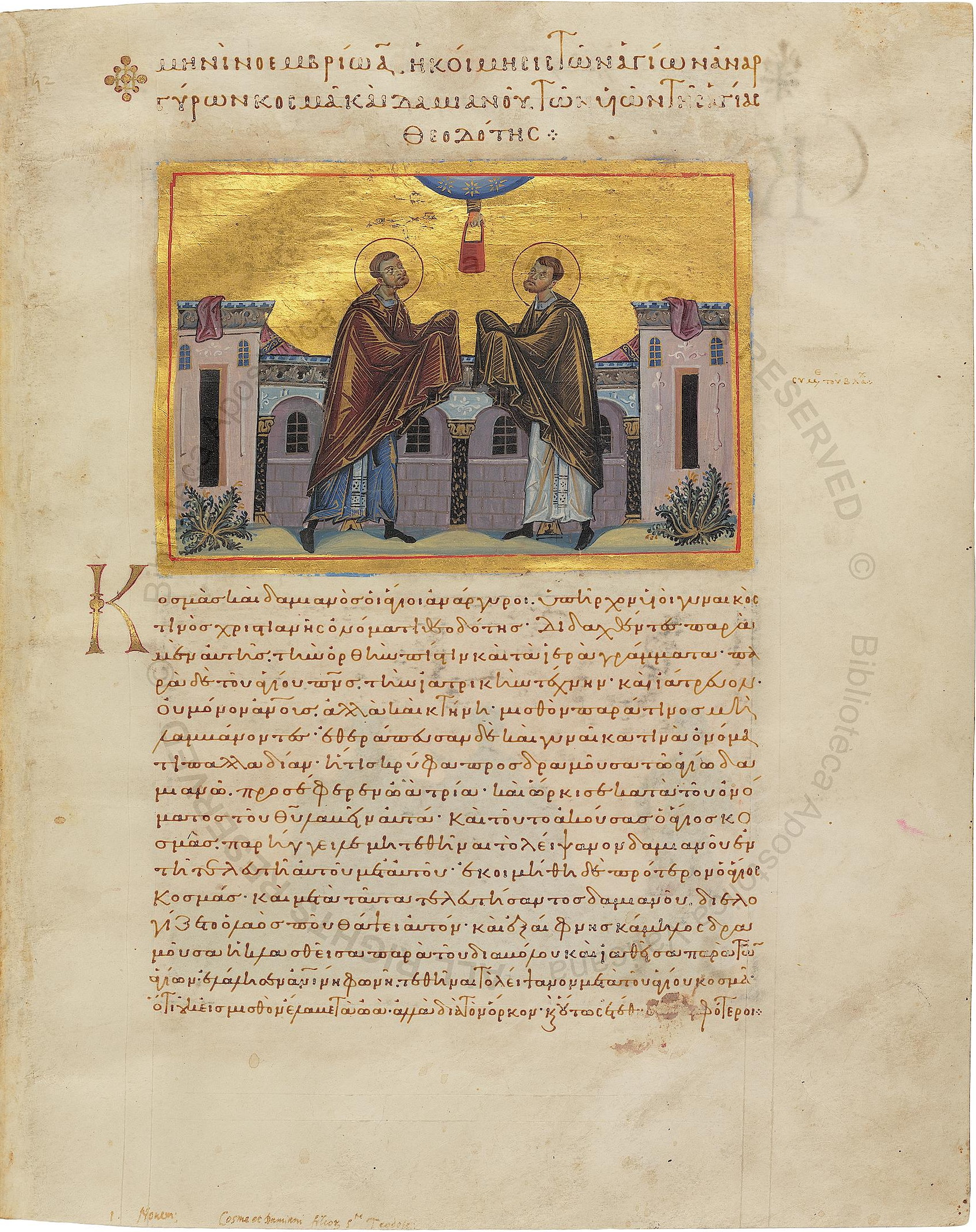
A page from the Menologium of Basil II, depicting Saints Cosmas and Damian (11th cent.)

Synaxaria, also known as menologia, are collections of saints' lives without the other liturgical material of the menaia. They correspond with Roman Catholic Martyrologies, although the usual Orthodox style is to provide fewer but fuller entries on the saints' lives. The most famous example is the Menologium of Basil II from around the year 1000. Some—such as the Menologium of Symeon Metaphrastes or the Syriac Menologium—bear a close resemblance to medieval Catholic legendaria and early modern recompilations of them such as Surius's Acta Sanctorum. Delehaye found that Symeon and other hagiographers of his era were largely conservative while compiling their works from earlier synaxaria but sparsely added additional materials from other—now uncertain—sources.

== Roman Catholicism ==
=== Private commemorations ===
In the early modern period, some Roman Catholic religious orders began to compile the names and eulogies of their notable members. Saracenus's Menologium Carmelitanum ("Menologium of the Carmelites") printed at Bologna in 1627 may have been the earliest of these, but did not yet include a daily arrangement and only listed formally canonized members of his order. This was soon followed by Crisóstomo Henríquez's Menologium Cisterciense ("Menologium of the Cistercians"), printed at Antwerp in 1630. Nuremberg and Nádasi wrote similar works for the Jesuits, although they did not title them menologia. The earliest Jesuit compilation using the title was printed in 1669, with Giuseppe Antonio Patrignani creating a greatly expanded volume in 1730 and François Elesban de Guilhermy gathering materials for a series (published posthumously) that provided a separate menologium for each of the Jesuits' separate assistancies (now known as conferences).

These compilations quickly began to include respected but uncanonized members and to organize them for commemoration according to a calendrical schedule. Such members might be reputed for their holiness or simply their learning. Published by private authority, these works were intended for private consultation or remembrance within the order but not for inclusion into the liturgy. The Church prohibited reading from such works as part of the Divine Office but allowed them to be read aloud in the chapter-house or refectory. Henríquez's menologium had already included the remark that "it would not appear unsuitable if it were read aloud in public or in chapter or at least in the refectory at the beginning of dinner or supper" and it remained the custom to read aloud from such works in Jesuit refectories as part of the evening meal into the 20th century. The Menologium Franciscanum ("Menologium of the Franciscans") published by Fortunatus Hüber in 1691 was similarly intended for such open recitation but noted that the concluding formula of the Roman Matyrology ("Et alibi aliorum...") should be replaced as the ferialis terminatio cuiuscumque diei with the three verses of Revelation beginning "Post hæc vidi turbam magnam..."

== See also ==
- Menologium der Orthodox-Katholischen Kirche des Morgenlandes
- Horologium, the book of hours in Eastern Orthodoxy
