= Cult of saints in Anglo-Saxon England =

A cult of saints played a key part within Anglo-Saxon Christianity, a form of Roman Catholicism practised in Anglo-Saxon England from the late sixth to the mid eleventh century.

Ecclesiastical authors produced hagiographies of many of these saints. These texts were aimed largely at an ecclesiastical audience, although some were also aimed at royalty and nobility, and outlined how to live an ideal Christian life.

== Definition ==
With a few exceptions, there was no "absolute definition" of what constituted a saint in Anglo-Saxon England. In some cases, particularly from the ninth century onward, designation of a deceased individual as a saint was authorised by a bishop or church council, although in other cases they were only designated as a saint by certain churches or religious communities. Blair suggested that it would often have been "rather vague" as to whether a revered individual was actually a saint or not in this period. While the Pope came to play an increasing role in deciding who was declared a saint from the tenth century onward, it was only in the twelfth century that they took control of canonization. From that point on, specific criteria were set out for who could be considered a saint: they had to have either been martyred or lived a particularly virtuous life, and to have produced posthumous miracles.

== Evidence ==
A series of catalogues were produced in the period between circa 1000 and 1200 which listed the resting-places of various English saints; the earliest of these, Secgan, incorporates what may be a list from the pre-Viking period.

== Origins and development ==
=== Antecedents ===
The Anglo-Saxon local saint was a development in a wider and older Roman tradition. The cult of saints had become a centrally important aspect of Christianity from at least the fourth century, when it was criticised by the final pagan Emperor of the Roman Empire, Julian the Apostate. Extramural cemeteries where individuals deemed to be saints were interred became prominent sites for Christian communities; St. Peter's Basilica in Rome was for example erected atop an extramural cemetery believed to house the remains of St Peter. Connected to this cult of saints was the cult of relics; in the eastern Roman Empire, the practice of breaking up the original remains for distribution among various churches began, and soon spread to elsewhere in Christendom. As a theoretical justification for this, several Christian thinkers — notably the Archbishop of Rouen, Victricius — argued that the saints produced such power that it even exuded from fragments of their bodies. The Church of Rome was concerned by the dispersal of human remains and so encouraged the veneration of secondary relics — objects that had been in contact with the remains of a saint — as an alternative.

The historian David Rollason suggested the possibility that some Romano-British saints' cults survived the Anglo-Saxon migration of the fifth century and continued to exist amid the growth of Anglo-Saxon paganism. One of these may have been the cult of St. Alban, and another associated with Sixtus, a figure later mentioned in a letter written by Pope Gregory the Great but about whom nothing is known.

=== The conversion of the Anglo-Saxons ===
Saints' relics began to appear in Anglo-Saxon England soon after the arrival of the first Christian missionaries. At the beginning of the seventh century, Pope Gregory the Great wrote to Augustine — who was leading the Gregorian mission to convert the Kingdom of Kent to Christianity — informing him that he was sending not only manuscripts, vestments, and sacred vessels, but also "relics of the holy apostles and martyrs" to aid the conversion process. Later in that century, Pope Vitalian sent the 'benefits' (beneficia) of the saints — relics of Peter the Apostle, Paul the Apostle, Lawrence, John and Paul, Gregory, and Pancras — to King Oswiu of Northumbria, also sending Oswiu's queen "a cross with a golden key, made from the holy fetters of the apostles St Peter and St Paul". These gifts likely reflected the Papal desire to link the burgeoning Anglo-Saxon Church with that in Rome.

Many Anglo-Saxons were also eager to obtain further relics from Rome. Circa 761, Benedict Biscop, who founded monasteries at Monkwearmouth and Jarrow, visited Rome and brought "holy relics of the blessed apostles and Christian martyrs" back to England. According to his eighth century biography written by Stephanus, Wilfrid, the founder of Hexham Abbey and Ripon Abbey, also brought many relics from Rome to England following both his 680 and 704 visits to Italy. Rollason also thought it likely that Benedict Biscop and Wilfrid would have brought relics to England from Frankish Gaul, an area that they both had close connections with and which was a prolific source for the creation of relics. Although we have no information revealing what form these relics took, Rollason thought it likely that these would have been secondary relics, which the Papacy preferred to distribute.

It is possible that saints' relics were perceived as being vital to the dedication of new churches in Anglo-Saxon England, particularly if — as Gregory the Great advised in a letter to Mellitus — many early churches were converted pagan temples. Alternately, in other instances relics may have been used for newly constructed churches; this is supported by a statement by Bede, which notes that Bishop Acca gathered relics and "put up altars for their veneration, establishing various chapels for this purpose within the walls of the church."

=== Seventh and eighth centuries ===
In Anglo-Saxon England, the seventh and eighth centuries have been described as the "age of saints". Blair noted that after 850, "saint-making was different in character and very much more restricted."

While hagiographies often presented saints' cults as arising spontaneously out of popular devotion, the establishment of such cults would have required an ecclesiastical impresario who could commission hagiographies, publicise alleged miracles, construct and decorate a shrine, organise a feast day, and if necessary organise the saints' site as a place of pilgrimage.

There were many links between royalty and the cult of saints, with many saints having been born to royal families and many churches having been established by royalty. In the Kingdom of Kent, saints' cults were typically located at abbeys which were also royal vills and therefore centres of royal administration. Royalty could use their affiliation to such cults in order to claim legitimacy against competitors to the throne. A dynasty may have had accrued prestige for having a saint in its family. Promoting a particular cult may have aided a royal family in claiming political dominance over an area, particularly if it was recently conquered.

Political and ecclesiastical rivalries influenced various saints' cults; there was for instance competition between the cults of Cuthbert and Wilfrid.

=== Late Anglo-Saxon period ===
From at least the late ninth century, there is evidence that Anglo-Saxon kings had their own relic collections.

The ecclesiastical reform movement of the late tenth century displayed an increased interest in the cult of saints. For these ecclesiastical reformers, the church of saints offered the opportunity for grandeur and prestige. In this period there was a proliferation of hagiographies, the production of which was sustained through to the mid-to-late eleventh century. The tenth century also witnessed the first records of lay people making pilgrimages to sites associated with saints' relics, suggesting that there had been a major expansion in the popularity of the saints' cults among the laity in that period. This expansion would be paralleled by contemporary developments in the area of the former Carolingian Empire. The growth of popular veneration of the saints could have arisen from spontaneous piety on behalf of the laity but also from the church's desire to further integrate the laity into its sphere of influence. The adoption of saints' festivals into the calendar would have aided both the clergy and the kings in regulating the laity's activities.

The political exploitation of the cult of saints continued into the eleventh century, as reflected in the actions of Cnut.

Following the Norman conquest of England in 1066, the cult of saints could have developed into a source of opposition to the new Norman administration, but this does not appear to have happened. In one of the anti-Norman rebellions, that led by Hereward the Wake, the rebels swore fealty to their cause on the body of St Æthelthryth—a local saint in the area of Ely where they were based—but there is no evidence that Æthelthryth became an enduring symbol of Anglo-Saxon resistance. Many of the Norman bishops and other ecclesiastical figures that were brought to England following the conquest utilised the pre-existing saints' cults to promote their own monasteries and churches. Moreover, during the Norman period, various older Anglo-Saxon figures were converted into saints; the ecclesiastical authorities at Rochester in Kent for instance declared Ithamar, a former Bishop of Rochester who appeared as a minor figure in Bede's Ecclesiastical History, to be a saint.

Blair argued that by 1100, many local saints were recognised in their own churches as founders and patrons, but that beyond this little or nothing was known of them.

Although hermits were by definition not based at minsters, by the eleventh century a number of major reformed houses had obtained the relics of hermits for their own collections.

== Saints ==
=== Imported saints ===
Various saints in Anglo-Saxon England, such as Peter and Paul, were those already venerated by the Church of Rome. Evidence for these figures dates from the seventh and eighth centuries and thus it is unclear if they were brought to Anglo-Saxon England earlier, with the Gregorian Mission. The Dialogues of Gregory the Great, a text produced in Rome that was largely concerned with the lives of Italian saints, was influential in Anglo-Saxon England, with the descriptions of miracles that it provided being copied by some Anglo-Saxon hagiographers, such as Bede in his Life of St Cuthbert. The Lindisfarne Gospels, produced circa 700, list festivals of two southern Italian saints, Januarius and Stephen, with the festival lists perhaps having been copied from a pre-existing Neapolitan list. The Old English Martyrology, probably composed in the ninth century, also contains a large number of southern and central Italian saints. It is not clear whether this Italian influence on the Anglo-Saxon cult of saints arose through texts that had travelled west or whether it had instead arisen through direct contact between the two regions of Europe. There is some evidence for Italian ecclesiastical figures who came to England—Hadrian, the former abbot of an Italian monastery, accompanied the Greek Theodore of Tarsus to England in 669, while Birinus, who evangelised Wessex, was also from Italy—and it may be that these individuals influenced the development of the Anglo-Saxon cult of saints.

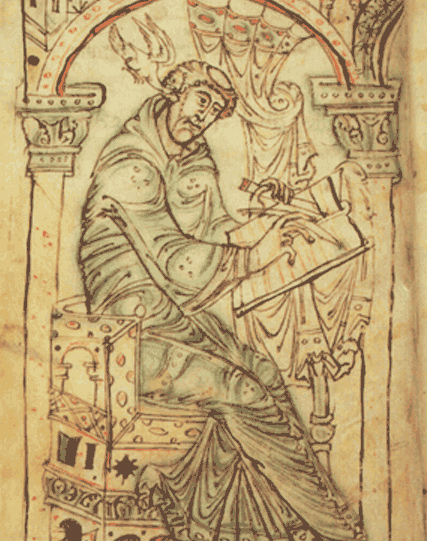
Gregory and his Dove, Corpus Christi College, Cambridge Ms 389

There is also evidence that Frankish Gaul influenced the choice of saints in Anglo-Saxon England. Various Anglo-Saxon churches were dedicated to the Frankish St Martin of Tours. An Anglo-Saxon copy of the Hieronymian Martyrology, which was originally composed in Rome during the fifth century, likely arrived in England via Gaul, where various saints were appended to it. A mid ninth century Anglo-Saxon calendar—MS Digby 63 in the Bodleian Library—includes various Frankish saints' days in it, particularly those from the Flanders area, testifying to an influence.

There is little evidence for an Irish influence over the Anglo-Saxon cult of saints. With the exception of a few prominent and widespread saintly figures like Patrick, Brigid, and Columba, Irish saints do not appear in Anglo-Saxon textual sources. There is also little evidence of an Irish influence on Anglo-Saxon hagiography, with the only possible exception being the putative impact of the Irish Life of St Columba on the anonymously authored Anglo-Saxon Life of St Cuthbert.

Gretsch stated that, with the exception of the apostles, it was Gregory the Great who "had enjoyed the largest and most universal veneration in Anglo-Saxon England". By the time that Bede and Aldhelm were writing their texts, at least two altars and one chapel had been dedicated to Gregory in England.

=== Royal saints ===
Anglo-Saxon England produced more royal saints than neighbouring regions of Northwestern Europe. The lives of some of these saints is attested from sources written in the Anglo-Saxon period, although others only survive in hagiographic accounts produced after the Norman Conquest. Some of these royal saints had been kings who retired to devote their lives to religious pursuits. In some cases, such as that of Ceolwulf, they were likely forced to adopt this course of action by political rivals. One suggestion has been that the emphasis that the Anglo-Saxons placed on royal saints derived from the influence of pagan ideas that kings had a sacred role in society.

Part of the explanation for the proliferation of royal saints may have been that royal families encouraged them, believing that they would gain prestige by having a familial connection to a saint. Many leading ecclesiastics were themselves members of royal families and may themselves have had an interest in promoting their own family members as saints. The Church may also have wished to strengthen the prestige of established royal dynasties in order to promote societal stability and strong government, from which the Church itself would have benefitted.

==== Martyred royal saints ====
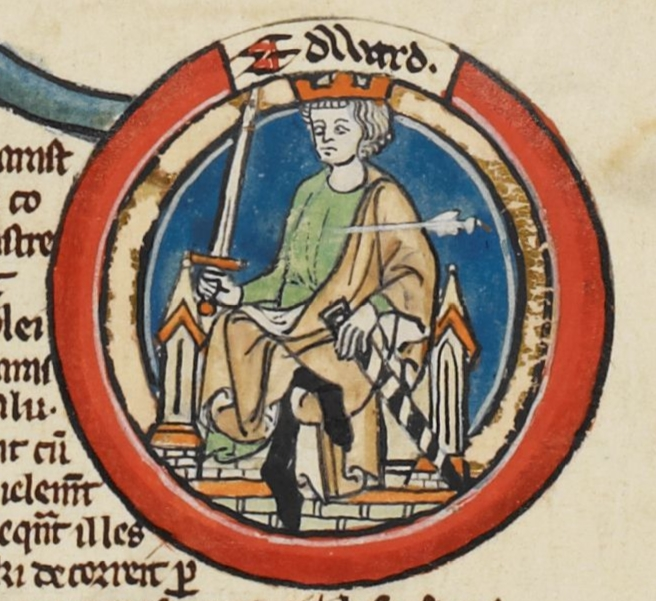
14th century depiction of the Anglo-Saxon royal saint Edward the Martyr

In various cases, these royal saints had been killed by other Christians. Of the martyred royal saints, the earliest date from the seventh century, with very few appearing throughout the eighth century, and then a number emerging in the late eighth and first half of the ninth centuries in the kingdoms of Northumbria and Mercia, with the very last known example coming from Wessex. The fact that motifs and tropes repeat in the various hagiographies of martyred saints led Rollason to suggest that the different authors were operating in a known hagiographical tradition and were borrowing from earlier works. For instance, the motif of a beam of divine light revealing the location of the body is associated with eight of these martyrs in their hagiographies; nine entail the murder being committed by a servant ordered to carry it out by their master; and seven claim that a religious foundation was established in the aftermath of the killing.

The earliest example of a martyred royal saint was Oswine of Deira, who was killed on the order of his rival, Oswiu of Bernicia. That Oswine was soon sanctified is suggested by the tone in which Bede describes him and his inclusion in the eighth-century kalendar of St Willibrord. The best documented example of a martyred royal saint is Edward the Martyr, who was killed in 978 or 979 while visiting his half-brother Æthelred the Unready. That he was sanctified purely for the manner of his death is suggested by the Vita Oswaldi—probably authored by Byrhtferth of Ramsey between 995 and 1005—which does not describe him as having exhibited any particular virtues during his lifetime. Three royal men of Northumbria were also martyred saints: the kings Eardwulf and Ælfwald and the prince Ealhmund. Eardwulf appears to differ from most other martyred royal saints in that he appeared to survive his execution. According to the story set forth in the Historia Regum annals, Eardwulf was put to death outside the gates of Ripon Minster, after which the monks carried his body to a church, where he revived during the night.

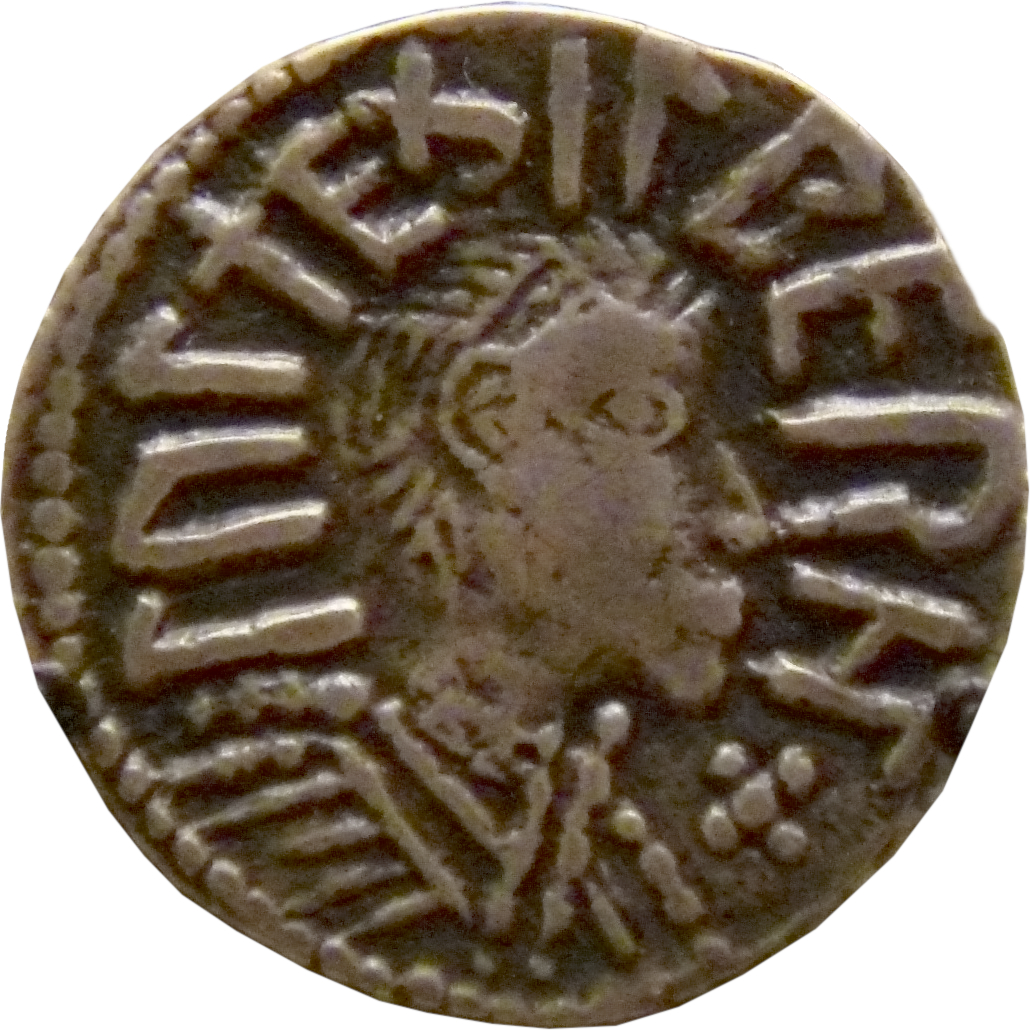
One of the four known coins depicting Æthelberht II, who posthumously became one of the martyred royal saints

Two seventh-century Kentish princes, Æthelred and Æethelberht, are also presented as martyred saints in a number of eleventh century and later sources. There is nevertheless evidence that they were venerated as saints from at least the early eighth century. There is also much evidence for the veneration of a ninth-century Mercian prince, Wigstan, and according to late medieval sources he too had been martyred. In this story, Wigstan had declined to inherit the throne after his father's death, but was then murdered in 849 by another prince, Beorhtfrith, in retaliation for Wigstan's opposition to his own mother, Ælflædd, marrying Beorhtfrith's father, the new king Beorhtwulf. Another sanctified Mercian royal was Æthelberht II of East Anglia, who—according to the Anglo-Saxon Chronicle—was killed by Offa of Mercia in 794. As with Wigstan, the details of his murder are only found in later medieval sources. Kenelm is also a putative murdered Mercian who became a saint, although the sources dealing with his murder are late medieval and display some contradictions with early medieval sources discussing the Mercian royal succession. Also attested only by late medieval sources are the murders of the Mercian princes Wulflad and Rufinus, allegedly by their father, who sought to punish them for converting to Christianity. There are various inconsistencies with this account, although it may represent the survival of a seventh-century event in garbled form.

One possibility as to why various murdered royals were sanctified was that the Church was seeking to dissuade such killings and thus promote societal stability. In such a scenario, kings might have reconsidered killing their rivals and enemies if they feared that the latter would actively be sanctified as a result of the killing. It is perhaps relevant that the apparent proliferation of martyred royal saints occurred in the late eighth and early ninth centuries, shortly after the 786 visit of the Papal legates to England, during which they had strongly condemned the killing of kings and princes. Another possibility for the propagation of the cults of martyred royalty may be political rather than ecclesiastical. These cults might have been cultivated by the enemies of the killers, who hoped that the cults would express and focus opposition to the latter. For instance, Cnut may have promoted the cult of Edward the Martyr to cast a negative image on Æthelred the Unready, who may have been Edward's killer and who a key rival of Cnut's.

== Hagiography ==
In Anglo-Saxon England, hagiographies—or written accounts of a saints' life—were not designed to serve as accurate biographies but rather as outlining a holy life for others to emulate. Evidence from the dedications found in Anglo-Saxon hagiographies suggest that they were intended largely for religious communities and in some cases for kings. That they were often written in Latin, and sometimes used complex Latin terminology, presupposes that their primary audience was ecclesiastical. In a few cases, some Old English translations were produced—there are Old English examples of Felix's Life of St [[Guthlac of Crowland|Guthlac]] and Bede's Life of St Chad—which could allow these hagiographers to have had a wider audience. The Life of Saint Guthlac and Bede's Life of St Cuthbert for instance both provide a description of how to be a good monk or hermit. There are other stories within the hagiographies that would have had greater relevance to layfolk, in particular members of the royalty and nobility.

In the tenth century, Anglo-Saxon hagiography began to display an increasing preoccupation with saintly authority and on the close relationship between saints and kings.

Of the 106 Old English hagiographical works, 66 of them (approximately two-thirds) were written by the abbot Ælfric of Eynsham. Of these, only 6 deal with English or British saints, with the majority being devoted to foreign ones. Studying this material, Gretsch suggested that political and ethical considerations would have influenced Ælfric's decisions regarding which saints to write about.

== Relics ==
The early medieval concept of a local saint was based on the idea that the holy could have a physical presence.

If a church possessed bodily relics of a saint, this served as both a mark of status and a devotional focus for worshippers.

=== Saints' bodies ===
Burial within a church was a prerequisite for an individual to be perceived as a saint in Anglo-Saxon England. The only known possible exception was St Guthlac of Crowland, whose hagiographer, Felix, vaguely described his body being interred under a monument, the nature of which was unspecified. The placement of a saints' corpse within a church enabled the ecclesiastical community to have control over the saint's cult, and to hold possession of the relics and their perceived power. Doing so also enabled the saint's remains to be located near to an altar, both accentuating the altar's sanctity and facilitating masses for the saint.

Some saints—such as St Sebbi and St John of Beverly—were buried directly inside the church following their death. In other cases, individuals who came to be interpreted as saints were first buried in the ground, typically in a churchyard, and only later were disinterred, with their bodies being moved into the church. This act of removing the relics is known as "translation". One account of such a translation is provided by Bede, who relates that when Æthelthryth, the Abbess of Ely, died in 679, she was buried in a wooden coffin amid other deceased nuns, as had been her instruction. Sixteen years later her successor and sister, Seaxburgh, ordered the monks of Ely to dig up Æthelthryth's body, place it within a white marble coffin found at an abandoned Roman fortress, and then relocate it into the church at Ely. Bede also provided an account of the disinterment and reburial of St Cuthbert, Bishop of Lindisfarne, who had initially been buried in the floor of St. Peter's Church. Cuthbert's successor, Eadberht, later ordered that his body be removed and placed in a higher and more prominent location, either on or above the floor of the church.

Rollason suggested that the act of disinterment and then reburial within the church served to mark out the deceased's identity as a saint within a societal context that had no standard process of canonisation. Various Anglo-Saxon accounts refer to a saint's body being disinterred and then placed within a newly constructed church; in this case the saint's presence could have helped to hallow the church, which itself would then provide a context and location for the saint's veneration. He also stressed that the act of disinterment may have been adopted by the Anglo-Saxons from Frankish Gaul, noting that such practices were not in lime with the Church of Rome at the time, which during the seventh and eighth centuries continued to retain its opposition to the disinterment of saintly remains.

The idea that the body and clothes of a deceased individual would be preserved at the time of disinterment was seen as a sign of sanctity in Anglo-Saxon England, as it had also been in Gaul. Bede recorded that during the disinterments of both St Æthelthryth and St Cuthbert, their bodies were found to have been miraculously preserved and undecayed. In the nineteenth century, a medical examination of St Cuthbert's remains found that there was still some evidence of fleshly preservation, thus lending credence to the Anglo-Saxon claim that his body was preserved following its original burial. Such preservation may have resulted from the particular conditions of the soil into which he had been placed, or it may have been that the body had been deliberately embalmed; the latter concept was known in Anglo-Saxon England, for instance appearing in a reference by Bede.

==== Coffins and grave coverings ====
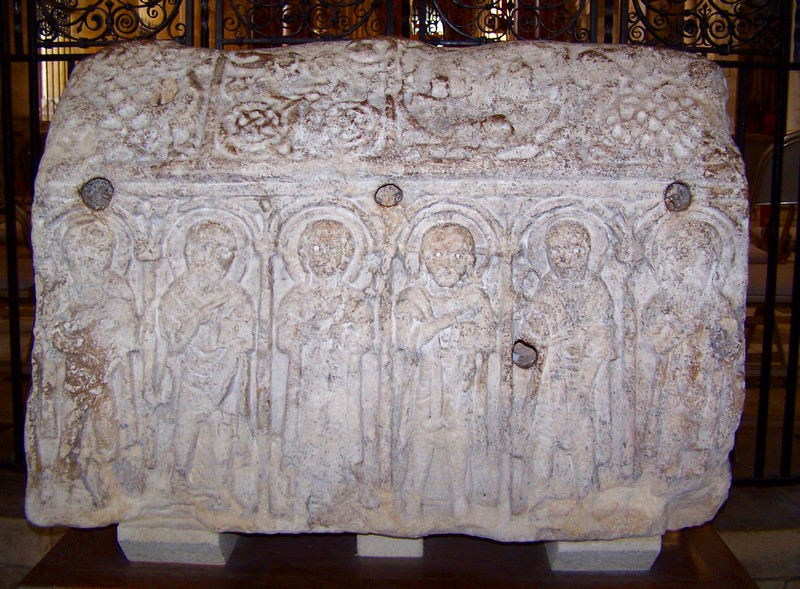
The Hedda Stone, Peterborough Cathedral was perhaps a covering of a saints' grave

The wooden coffin of St Cuthbert was uncovered in 1827. It is incised with depictions of the Virgin Mary and the infant Jesus, angels, and apostles on the sides, and of Jesus on the lid. A number of decorated stone coffins also survive from the Anglo-Saxon period, although it is unclear who the individuals were that they covered. Some may have entombed the remains of saints although others may have contained the remains of wealthy layfolk.

The fragmentary stone chests in the shape of houses located at Jedburgh and St Andrews, both of which are attributed to the Anglo-Saxon period, may have represented reliquary-coffins. That at St Andrews was found in the churchyard of the church of St Rule, and thus may have once covered the tomb of this figure. It is also possible that the ridged stones with Anglo-Saxon styles of decoration on them—for instance the Hedda Stone from Peterborough Cathedral and the St. Leonard's School Shrine from St. Andrews—may have covered saints' graves. Records indicate that in a later period of time the ridges of the Hedda Stone collected dust which was then considered to have the power to bring about miracles; it is possible that this belief has Anglo-Saxon origins.

=== Minor relics ===
Minor relics were likely often placed within a small cavity within a stone altar, covered either with a stone or a metal plate. No English examples of this survive, although a comparable instance can be found in Petersburg-bei-Fulda in western Germany. In other cases, smaller relics were likely contained within reliquary caskets. Two likely Anglo-Saxon examples have been preserved in continental Europe. One, attributed to the second half of the eighth century, is made of walrus ivory and it located in the Herzog Anton Ulrich-Museum in Brunswick. The other is wooden with gilded copper and contains both English runes and the English name Ædan, likely the creator; it is located at St Évroult at Mortain in Normandy. One possible reliquary was the gold and garnet cross—containing a cavity in the central boss—that was found with St. Cuthbert's remains.

=== Social uses ===
Pontificals produced during the tenth and eleventh century demonstrate that at this point, relics were used in ceremonies to dedicate a church.

Saints' relics were sometimes employed during the swearing of oaths. In 876, King Alfred the Great made the Danish Army swear upon such relics. The Bayeux Tapestry features a depiction of Harold Godwinson swearing an oath to William, Duke of Normandy over a reliquary. A number of records from the period also indicate that saints' relics sometimes played a part in ceremonies marking the manumission of slaves. They also featured in a number of recorded judicial ordeals carried out with the intention of determining whether an accused individual was innocent or guilty of a particular crime. The presence of relics is prescribed in five of the sixteen surviving texts which describe ordeal rituals from this period.

Records also indicate that relics were employed during outdoor penitential processions. These include Rogation Day processions designed to promote the fertility of the land by blessing them. They also appeared in processions designed to ward off a particular threat; for instance, at his council at Bath, King Æthelred ordered processions involving relics to counter the Viking threat.

== Saints and healing ==
In various hagiographies, there are accounts of saints performing acts of healing. In most of these descriptions, those healed were ecclesiastics or members of the nobility.
