= Nun of Watton =

12th-century English nun

The Nun of Watton (born in the 1140s) was a young nun at Watton Priory in Yorkshire who, according to an account recorded by St Aelred of Rievaulx around 1160 in De Quodam Miraculo Mirabili, long known as De Sanctimoniali de Wattun, was impregnated by a young lay brother and miraculously cleansed of sin.

== Account ==
The nun was admitted to the Gilbertine monastery at Watton in the East Riding of Yorkshire, one of the most successful monasteries of those founded by Gilbert of Sempringham, at approximately four years of age, upon the request of Henry Murdac, Archbishop of York. Nothing is known about her family, however, the fact that Henry took an interest in her, as well as her stature as a nun at an early age (as opposed to a lay sister) suggests that she was not from the lowest ranks of society. At this time the policy of the Gilbertines on accepting children into religious order was less strict than in many contemporary religious orders, although it became stricter later.

Aelred himself was a Cistercian, and his order took a paternalistic interest in the newly founded Gilbertine monasteries after refusing to accept responsibility for them. The Gilbertine Watton Priory was a double monastery with both male and female members, and was the only such house in the diocese of York in the twelfth century.

According to Aelred's report of the senior nuns' comments, (1110–1167) the young girl adopted into the monastery grew into a rebellious young woman. She soon made the acquaintance of a lay brother in the attached male community, meeting him when some of the brothers "to whom the care of external affairs was entrusted" entered the nunnery to do some work. One of these brothers, described by Aelred as "more comely than the others in features and more flourishing in age," captured her attraction, and after a series of discreet exchanges, they arranged to meet at night "at the sound of a stone" that the brother promised to throw onto the roof or wall of the building where she was waiting.

After two unsuccessful attempts, the two finally managed to meet. According to Aelred, "She went out a virgin of Christ, and she soon returned an adulteress," clearly indicating that their furtive relationship had been consummated following their encounter. The lovers continued to meet secretly, until eventually the other nuns became suspicious of the repeated noise of the stones thrown by the man. The senior sisters challenged the young nun, who confessed to her sins.

Aelred then goes on to describe the fury of the nuns who seized and beat the young woman in punishment for her crime. They tore her veil from her head, and were prevented only by the senior sisters from burning, flaying, and branding the young nun. She was then chained by fetters on each leg, placed in a cell, and fed with only bread and water. Megan Cassidy-Welch "demonstrates the diverse ways in which medieval Christian thinkers portrayed the prison as an essentially reformist and salvific space since, separated from the temptations of the outside world, prisoners had an ample opportunity to devote themselves to continuous prayer, contrition, and praise of God."

The male culprit fled from Watton; however, his subsequent whereabouts were revealed by the nun. He was then tracked down by several brothers from Watton, who captured him by having one brother impersonate the culprit's lover and lure him in, while the other brothers lay in wait to attack.

After the young man was captured, the nuns, filled with religious zeal and with a desire to avenge their injured virginity, engaged in a brutal attack on the offending brother. He was taken by them, thrown down, and held while his lover stood by. She was handed an instrument, presumably a knife of some sort, and she was forced to castrate him. At this point, one of the senior sisters snatched the newly severed genitalia and thrust them into the disgraced nun's mouth.

Following the castration, the young man was returned to the brothers, and the nun was put back into her prison. Henry Murdac, Archbishop of York, who had brought her to the priory, then appeared to the nun in her sleep, instructing her to confess her sins and recite psalms. He returned to her again on the following night, just when the nun was about to give birth. He was accompanied by two heavenly women, who took away the baby, and cleansed the young nun's body of sin and pregnancy. This caused her chains and fetters to fall off.

The next morning, her caretakers found her healthy, clean, and distinctly not pregnant. After thorough inspection of her cell, they found no evidence of a birth at all. Additionally, the chains and fetters that had previously held her had fallen off. After Gilbert was informed of these miraculous events, he consulted Aelred before proceeding. Aelred investigated and declared the event to be a miracle after deciding that she could have been freed "neither by others nor by herself without the strength of God", and therefore it would be sacrilegious to imprison her again. Aelred fully accepted the authenticity of the events he described, and deemed the miraculous delivery of the child and the freeing of the nun from her fetters to be more important than the preceding acts of adultery and punishment. However, he was also intensely critical of the nun's fellow sisters and of Gilbert of Sempringham himself for their lack of pastoral care.

== Interpretation ==
Jane Patricia Freeland's 2006 translation of the work shows Aelred's ambivalence about the propriety of the nuns' behaviour toward their charge and her lover, and the apparent absence of pastoral care available to the hapless young woman at the centre of this case. Brian Golding's history of the Gilbertines places the incident in its historical context. According to Barbara Hargreaves, Aelred's letter "is a redemptive narrative, written to be understood both literally and metaphorically. Aelred uses the physicality of the pregnancy itself, and the conditions of the nun’s incarceration, to bring to his reader the themes of physical and spiritual gestation and rebirth."

== Bibliography ==
- Aelredi Rievallensis: “De Quodam Miraculo Mirabili,” ed. Domenico Pezzini, Corpus Christianorum, Continuatio Mediaevalis 3 [Turnholt: Brepols, 2017] 135–46, 253*–69*.
- Aelred of Rievaulx: “A Certain Wonderful Miracle,” in Aelred of Rievaulx, "Lives of the Northern Saints," trans. Jane Patricia Freeland, ed. Marsha L. Dutton, CF 71 (Kalamazoo: Cistercian, 2006): 109–22.
- Giles Constable, "Aelred of Rievaulx and the Nun of Watton: An Episode in the Early History of the Gilbertine Order," in Medieval Women, ed. Derek Baker. Oxford: Blackwell, 1981: ISBN 0-631-12539-6
- Dietz, Elias: “Ambivalence Well Considered: An Interpretive Key to the Whole of Aelred’s Works,” Cistercian Studies Quarterly 47.1 (2012): 71–85.
- Marsha Dutton: "Were Aelred of Rievaulx and Gilbert of Sempringham Friends?” in "American Benedictine Review" 68.3 [2017]: 274–300.
- Elizabeth Freeman: The Medieval Nuns at Watton: Reading Female Agency from Male-Authorized Didactic Texts, in "Magistra" 6.1 (2000): 3–36.
