= Listed buildings in Watton, East Riding of Yorkshire =

Watton is a civil parish in the county of the East Riding of Yorkshire, England. It contains three listed buildings that are recorded in the National Heritage List for England. Of these, two are listed at Grade I, the highest of the three grades, and the other is at Grade II*, the middle grade. The parish contains the village of Watton and the surrounding area. All the listed buildings are to the east of the village, and consist of a church, a former prior's house, and an outbuilding.

== Key ==
Grade	Criteria
I	Buildings of exceptional interest, sometimes considered to be internationally important
II*	Particularly important buildings of more than special interest

== Buildings ==
Name and location	Photograph	Date	Notes	Grade
Watton Abbey; 53.93420°N 0.44262°W		Late 14th century	A prior's house, later a private house, which has been altered and extended. It is in pinkish-red brick with stone dressings and limestone with purple brick dressings, and has a Welsh slate roof. There are three storeys, a three-bay central range, the left bay containing a two-storey canted bay window. On the angles and at the rear are four-stage octagonal embattled turrets, and on the left is a recessed three-storey single-bay gabled wing. On the front is a single-storey gabled porch, and above it is a stone niche. Most of the windows have two round-arched lights and hood moulds.	I
St Mary's Church; 53.93366°N 0.44488°W		15th century	The church, which incorporates earlier material, has been altered and extended through the centuries. It is built in pinkish-red brick, with stone dressings, and roofs of lead and tile. It consists of a nave with a south porch and a north vestry, a chancel and a west tower. The tower has three stages, a chamfered plinth, angle buttresses, one with an incised mass clock, a three-light flat-headed west window with a hood mould, a chamfered band, pointed openings in the middle stage, and above are two-light bell openings, a chamfered cornice, and a low parapet.	I
Outbuilding, Watton Abbey; 53.93521°N 0.44301°W		Late 16th century	The building, which has been restored, is in pinkish-yellow brick, with dressings in moulded brick and stone, on a plinth, with a floor band, a stepped eaves band, and brick copings and a stone kneeler with tumbled-in brick to the left gable. There are two storeys and eleven bays. The building contains openings of various types, including cart and stable entrances, and casement windows.	II*
