= Cambridge, Corpus Christi College, MS 139 =

English manuscript

Cambridge, Corpus Christi College, MS 139 is a northern English manuscript compiled c. 1170. Apart from preliminary additions (i + ii), it contains two separate volumes, comprising 180 folios in total. The original first volume has 165 folios in twenty gatherings, about half of which are occupied by the historical compilation Historia regum, which runs from f. 51v to 129v. In the sixteenth century, the codex was bequeathed by Matthew Parker to the Parker Library of Corpus Christi College, Cambridge, where it is held to this day.

== Contents ==
	folios	description
	i–ii	Preliminary matter
1	1r–16v	Historia omnimoda (“Universal history”)
2	17r–25v	Extracts from Regino of Prüm's Chronicon
3	36r–46r	Richard of Hexham, De gestis regis Stephani et de bello Standardii
4	46r–48v	Chronicle from Adam to Emperor Henry V
5	48v–50r	Letter to Hugh, Dean of York, De archiepiscopis Eboraci, ascribed to Symeon of Durham.
6	50r–51v	De obsessione Dunelmi et de Probitate Ucthredi Comitis.
7	51v–129v	Historia regum.
8	129v–147r	Historia Johannis prioris Haugustaldensis Ecclesie xxv annorum, a continuation of Historia regum by John, prior of Hexham.
9	132r	Erased rubric and sketch of comet
10	132v	Serlo of Wilton's poem on the Battle of the Standard.
11	133r–v	Poem on death of Somerled, by the Glasgow clerk William
12	133v–138r	Ailred of Rievaulx, Relatio de Standardo, treatise on the Battle of the Standard.
8	138r–147r	Historia Johannis resumes.
13	147r–149v	Ailred of Rievaulx, De Sanctimoniali de Wattun
14	150r–152v	Account of St Mary's Abbey at York
15	152v	Item, e.g. on foundation of Fountains in 1132.
16	153r–158r	Letter by Thurstan, archbishop of York, to William of Corbeil, archbishop of Canterbury.
17–20	158r–161v	Extracts from William of Malmesbury's Gesta regum.
21	162r	Fragmentary saga about King Ælla of Northumbria and his relation with the wife of merchant Ærnulf.
22	165r–v	De eo quod Eboracensis Ecclesia nullum dominium super Scottos habere debet.
23	165v	Story about a clerk interrogating the spirit of Malcolm IV of Scotland (d. 1165)
	166–80	Second volume: Historia Brittonum (incl. Frankish Table of Nations), Life of St Gildas

== See also ==
- Cambridge University Library, Ff. i.27
- Cambridge, Corpus Christi College, MS 303
