= De Sanctimoniali de Wattun =

12th-century miracle story in Yorkshire

De Sanctimoniali de Wattun or On the Nun of Watton is a 12th-century miracle story, describing events which took place in Yorkshire in the mid-12th century at the nunnery of Watton, East Riding of Yorkshire. It is also called A Certain Wonderful Miracle.

De Sanctimoniali de Wattun survives in one manuscript, MS Corpus Christi College 139. It is thought to have been written around 1160. The author is usually thought of as the Cistercian abbot Ailred of Rievaulx, an identification that is probable if not certain. The author's source for the events described were the older nuns of the monastery.

It is set in the Gilbertine nunnery of Watton, and tells the story of the Nun of Watton. The author related that as a four-year-old girl, she was given to the nunnery by Henry Murdac, Archbishop of York, but failed to embrace the religious life with much enthusiasm. Finally, she begins an affair with a lay brother, becoming pregnant. After the other anchoresses discover the affair, she escapes being burned to death or skinned alive and is locked in a cell, before being forced to castrate her ex-lover. Back in her cell, God intervenes, ends her pregnancy and frees her of her chains, events which the community came to recognise as miracles.

== See also ==
- The Innocents (2016 film)
