= Relatio de Standardo =

Relatio de Standardo ("An Account of the [Battle of the] Standard"), or De bello standardii ("on the Battle of the Standard"), is a text composed probably in 1153 or 1154 by the Cistercian monk Aelred of Rievaulx, describing the Battle of the Standard, fought near Northallerton in 1138 between David I, King of Scotland, and a Norman army fighting in support of King Stephen of England.

It is notable for being one of Aelred's two most seriously historical or political works, the other being his "Genealogy of the Kings of the English". The work has no known patron, though it eulogises Walter Espec and Eustace fitz John and gives a good account of King David; it is hostile towards William fitz Duncan.

"Relatio" praises the English and Normans fighting on Stephen's behalf and is critical of the Scots and Galwegians. The work has been commented upon by modern historians for its vision of English and Norman unity against the alleged barbarism from the Scots and Galwegians.

According to Gransden it survives in only one manuscript, the famous Corpus Christi College Cambridge MS. 139.

In addition to the narrative of the battle, with the Norman forces fighting under the protection of the saints, this work also explores the nature and value of history and gives some extended attention to the founding of Rievaulx itself.
