= Eanbert of Lindisfarne =

9th-century Bishop of Lindisfarne

- Bishop of Lindisfarne
- In office: 845
- Predecessor: Ecgred
- Successor: Eardulf

Personal details
- Died: 854
- Denomination: Christian

Eanbert of Lindisfarne (died 854) was Bishop of Lindisfarne from 845 until 854. He was the penultimate bishop to reside at Lindisfarne, which by this time was regularly being invaded by Vikings.

== Citations ==
Christian titles
Preceded by Ecgred	Bishop of Lindisfarne; 845–854	Succeeded by Eardulf
