= Gilbertine Order =

Order founded by Gilbert of Sempringham

- Order of Gilbertine Canons Regular
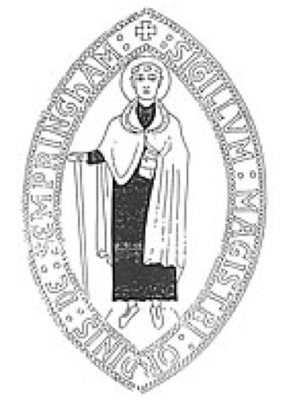
- Seal of the Master of the Order of Sempringham
- Named after: Gilbert of Sempringham
- Formation: c. 1130
- Founder: Gilbert of Sempringham
- Founded at: Sempringham
- Dissolved: 1539
- Legal status: Dissolved
- Headquarters: Sempringham Priory
- Location: England
- Official language: English
- Master of the Gilbertine Order: Gilbert of Sempringham (first); Robert Holgate (last)
- Affiliations: Catholic Church

The Gilbertine Order was a Catholic religious institute of canons regular founded around 1130 by Gilbert of Sempringham in Sempringham, Lincolnshire, where Gilbert was the parish priest. It was the only completely English religious order and came to an end in the 16th century at the time of the Dissolution of the Monasteries. Modest Gilbertine revivals have taken place in the late 20th and early 21st centuries on three continents.

== Founding ==
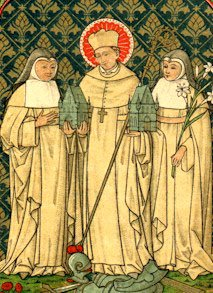
Gilbert of Sempringham flanked by two nuns

Gilbert initially established a community for enclosed contemplative nuns. He accepted seven women whom he had taught in the village school and in 1131 founded an order of nuns based on the Cistercian Rule. Gilbert set up buildings and a cloister for them against the north wall of the church, which stood on his land at Sempringham, and gave them a rule of life, enjoining upon them chastity, humility, obedience, and charity. Their daily necessaries were passed to them through a window by some girls chosen by Gilbert from among his people.

As the serving maids requested that they too might have a dress and rule of life, on the advice of William, abbot of Rievaulx, he decided to add lay sisters to the community. Eventually Gilbert added lay brothers to work the fields. In 1139 the small order opened its first new foundation on the island of Haverholm, a gift from Alexander, Bishop of Lincoln. Each Gilbertine house now practically consisted of four communities, one of nuns, one of canons, one of lay sisters, and one of lay brothers. Over the years, more and more new foundations were established.

In 1147 he left England for Continental Europe to seek assistance, and approached the Cistercian Order at its major house in Cîteaux to take on the running of his foundations. The Cistercians declined, apparently because they felt unable to administer houses for both men and women, but Pope Eugene III, himself a Cistercian, intervened to ask the abbot, Saint Bernard of Clairvaux, to assist Gilbert in drawing up Institutes for a new Order, which combined Benedictine and Cistercian influences. Pope Eugene then appointed Gilbert as the first Master of the Order of Sempringham or Gilbertines. Gilbert returned to England in 1148, and completed the order, by appointing canons, who lived according to variant of the Augustinian rule, to serve his community as priests, and to help him in the work of administration.

Towards the end of Gilbert's life, (Note: Often dated around 1170 to 1175, but possibly earlier than this.) when he was around 90 years old, some of the lay brothers at Sempringham rose up against him, complaining of too much work and too little food. The rebels, led by two skilled craftsmen, received money from both religious and secular supporters and took their case to Rome. Pope Alexander III ruled in Gilbert's favour, but the living conditions of the lay brothers were improved thereafter.

== Habits ==
- The Nuns wore a black tunic and a black scapular for work. They also wore a black lamb's wool head-dress with a coarse black cloth veil.
- The Sisters wore a dark tunic without the scapular. They also wore a sheepskin cloak and a long hood.
- The Canons Regular wore a black cassock with a white hooded cloak (lined with lamb's wool) with shoes of red leather. When labouring, they would use the scapular. In choir, they each wore a white cowl.
- The Brothers wore a dark tunic with a dark cloak lined with rough skins. In church they wore a cloth cowl which descended to the heels.

== Layout ==
Each Gilbertine priory had one church, divided unequally by a wall. The nuns had the larger part, and the canons the smaller. The latter would join the nuns only to celebrate mass. From the church, the nunnery normally stood to the north and the canons' lodgings to the south.

== The Middle Ages ==
The Gilbertine order was always popular in England and Wales. Its houses were the final homes of the last of the Welsh royal family, young daughters, after the rest had been defeated and killed in the 1280s. Principal among these was Gwenllian who was sent to Sempringham Priory and a monument commemorating her was placed near the Priory site in the 1990s. Many English kings gave the order generous charters, and yet it always had financial problems. By the end of the 15th century, the Order was greatly impoverished, and King Henry VI exempted all of its houses from paying taxes and from any other sort of payment. He could not force his successors to do the same.

In the mid-twelfth century, a girl was brought to Watton Priory as a child, but had no real religious vocation. This Nun of Watton became pregnant by a lay brother, who fled, but he was brought back for punishment.

== Dissolution ==
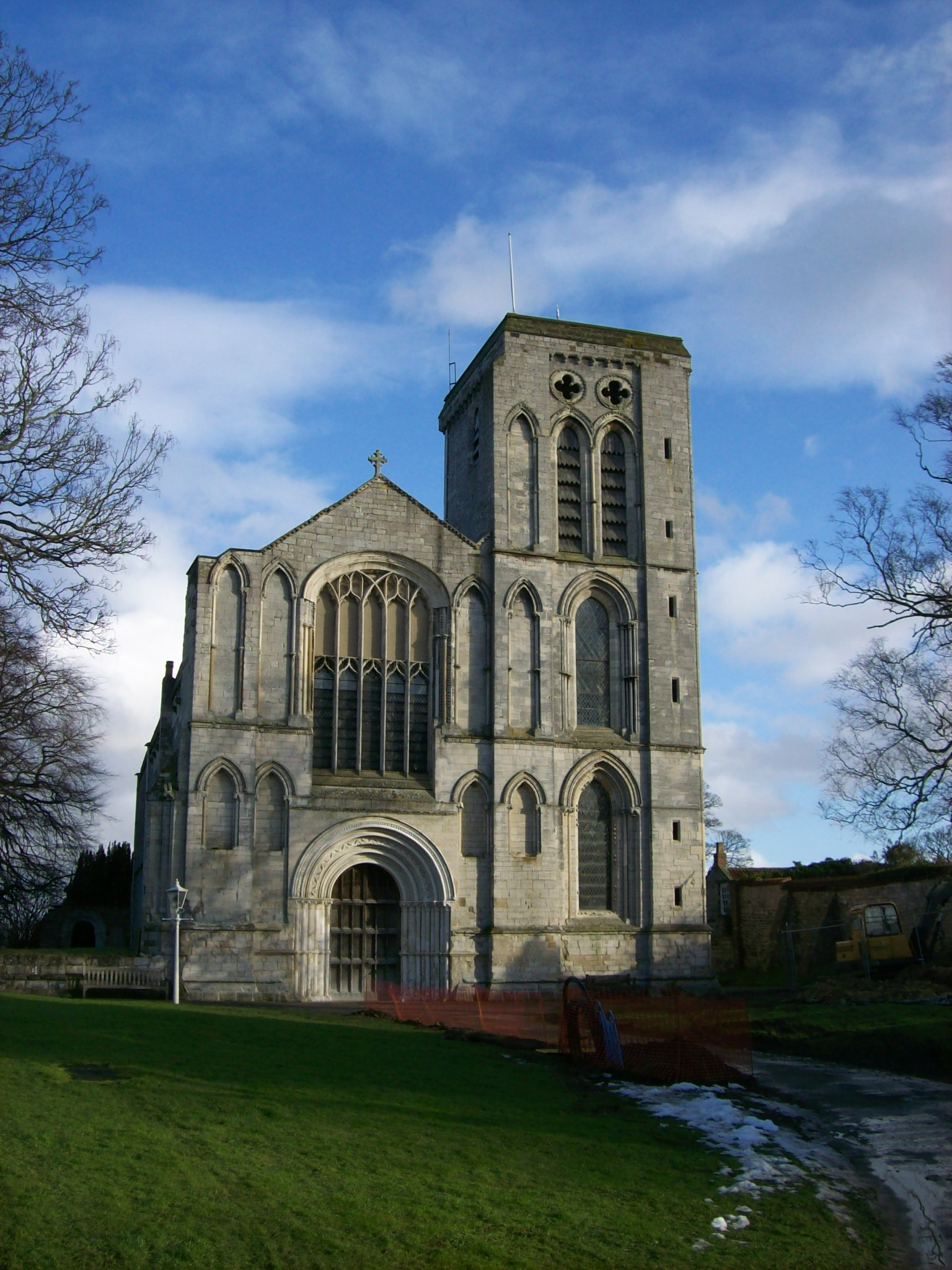
Malton Priory, west front

By the time of the Dissolution, there were twenty-six houses of Gilbertines, but only four of these were ranked as "greater houses", having annual incomes above £200. Following the Suppression of Religious Houses Act 1535, these houses gave in to King Henry VIII in 1538 without a fight, surrendering "of their own free will". Each nun and canon then received a pension for the rest of their lives.

The last Master of the Order, Robert Holgate, is credited with using his influence to save them for a few years. Malton Priory, one of the lesser Gilbertine houses, was the last to surrender in December 1539, whereas Sempringham Priory, worth more than £200 a year, surrendered in 1538. Holgate was already the Bishop of Llandaff but translated to become Archbishop of York in 1545.

The Gilbertines were the only purely English order (except for one short-lived house in Scotland), therefore the Dissolution marked their permanent end.

== Legacy ==
The Gilbertine legacy is fairly small; only fifteen extant manuscripts are associated with the Order, originating from only five of the Gilbertine houses. Four additional works ascribed to Gilbertines, but not surviving in Gilbertine copies, include the Vita of Gilbert of Sempringham, the Gilbertine Rule, the so-called 'Sempringham Continuation' to Le Livere de Reis Engleterre, and the works of Robert Mannyng.

The remains of one Gilbertine monastery, Malton Priory, have been incorporated into the parish church at Malton in North Yorkshire. The original monastery was established around 1150, and, though it has suffered considerable abuse, the surviving fragment remains impressive. Although the Priory at Sempringham was destroyed, the adjacent and contemporary parish church of St Andrew remains and some evidence of mediaeval decoration is still to be found.

The remains of Mattersey Priory are currently managed by English Heritage.

In 2001, British Channel 4 Television's archaeological series Time Team excavated a Gilbertine monastery in Chicksands, Bedfordshire. The programme was shown in 2002 as part of series 9 of Time Team.

== Gilbertine revivals ==
=== Oblates of St Gilbert ===
In 1983, following celebrations of the 900th anniversary of Gilbert's birth, a number of lay people in the East Midlands undertook to sustain the memory and work of Gilbert and the Gilbertine Order by establishing a new secular order. The Oblates of St Gilbert exist to promote the Gilbertine contemplative spirit and to foster interest in the study of Gilbert and his Order. They are supported by the Cistercian monastery of Mount St Bernard Abbey in Leicestershire.

In about 1998, Carlos Aparecido Marchesani, a Catholic priest of the Archdiocese of São Paulo in Brazil, visited the Gilbertine Oblates as he had had a devotion to Saint Gilbert since his time as a seminarian in the United States. He obtained permission from his bishop to found a small religious community, the Fraternidade São Gilbert, ad experimentum, which was set up near São Paulo. This experimental community was dissolved in 2012.

=== The Companions of St Gilbert of Sempringham ===
A Catholic Gilbertine community, The Canons Regular of St Gilbert of Sempringham (GSmp), began in 2017 in Canada within the Personal Ordinariate of the Chair of Saint Peter. In August 2019 members discerned that a full restoration could not take place as was desired. The Companions of St Gilbert of Sempringham, which existed alongside the canons regular, not unlike a third order in structure and purpose, will now be the main expression of Gilbertine spirituality resulting from this attempt at a restoration; it had begun as a de facto association of the faithful.

== In popular fiction ==
The detective novel The Beautiful Mystery (2012), by Louise Penny, is set in a fictional Gilbertine abbey in rural Quebec.

== See also ==
- Category:Gilbertine nunneries
- Category:Gilbertine monasteries
- Anchorite

== Bibliography ==
- Brian Golding: Gilbert of Sempringham and the Gilbertine Order: Oxford: Oxford University Press: 1995: ISBN 0-19-820060-9
