= Eardulf of Lindisfarne =

9th-century Bishop of Lindisfarne

- Bishop of Lindisfarne; Bishop of Chester-le-Street
- In office: 854
- Predecessor: Eanbert
- Successor: Cutheard

Personal details
- Died: 899
- Denomination: Christian

Eardulf of Lindisfarne (died 899) was Bishop of Lindisfarne for 46 years between 854, following the death of his predecessor, and his own death. He was chiefly responsible for removing the remains of St Cuthbert from Lindisfarne to protect them from Viking invasions, eventually resettling them in Chester-le-Street and temporarily running the see from there.

According to legend, Eardulf and Eadred, former abbot of Carlisle, attempted to take Cuthbert's remains to Ireland for safety; however, as they attempted to take the bones on board a ship at Workington, a violent storm blew up and all the water that fell on the ship turned immediately to blood, which was taken as a sign of disapproval from Cuthbert himself.

During their seven years of wandering with Cuthbert's remains the monks were also known to have visited Galloway and stayed in a cave now known as St Cuthbert's Cave in Northumberland.

== Citations ==
Christian titles
| Preceded by Eanbert | Bishop of Lindisfarne; 854–900 (after 883 at Chester-le-Street) | Succeeded by Cutheard |
