= Historia Regum =

Historical compilation attributed to Symeon of Durham

The Historia Regum ("History of the Kings") is a historical compilation attributed to Symeon of Durham and Byrhtferth of Ramsey, which presents material going from the death of Bede until 1129. It survives only in one manuscript compiled in Yorkshire in the mid-to-late 12th century, though the material is earlier. It is an often-used source for medieval English and Northumbrian history.

== Sources ==
It is a "historical compilation" or a "historical collection" rather than a chronicle or anything else. Antonia Gransden and David Rollason list its sources as follows:

	folios	pages	Description
1.	51v–54v	3–13	The Kentish Royal Legend, i.e. 7th- and 8th- century Kentish legends, including that of the martyr princes Æthelberht and Æthelred.
2.	54v–55r	13–15	An early list of Northumbrian rulers, from Ida of Bernicia to Ceolwulf of Northumbria (d. 737), stylistically embellished and supplemented by two citations from Boethius.
3.	55r–58v	15–30	Material from Bede, including Historia ecclesiastica gentis Anglorum and especially Historia abbatum.
4.	58v–68v	28/30–68	Lost Northumbrian annals covering 732–802.
5.	68v–75r	69–91	Annals covering 849–887, derived mainly from Asser's Life of King Alfred.
6.	75r–76r	91–95	A series of annals written after 1042 covering 888–957.
7.	76r–76v	95–98	Extracts taken from William of Malmesbury's Gesta Regum
8.	76v–123v	98–258	Material from the Chronicle of John of Worcester. supplemented by a now lost "Northern" recension of the Anglo-Saxon Chronicle related to the extant D-recension, by the Libellus de Exordio, by the Historia Novorum of Eadmer, by Dudo of St Quentin and by William of Jumièges.
9.	123v–129v	258–283	A chronicle covering the period 1119–1129.

Much of the compiled material up until 887, i.e. the first five sections, was itself probably derived from an earlier compilation by Byrhtferth of Ramsey, and probably some of it was compiled before the end of the 10th century. The material covering 1119–1129 does appear to be original, and this part may have been authored by Symeon.

== Manuscripts and authorship ==
The full text survives in one manuscript, Cambridge, Corpus Christi College, MS 139, at folios 51v–129v, written down in the late 12th century. An abbreviated copy is also found in Paris, Bibliothèque nationale de France, MS nouv. acq. lat. 692. Even though the Cambridge manuscript names Symeon as the author in an incipit and an explicit, Symeon's authorship of the work is often doubted by modern historians. Besides not being an original historical work, reasons of internal evidence make it highly unlikely that the Historia Regum was written by the same author as the Libellus de exordio, which is generally accepted to have been authored by Symeon.

== Editions ==
- Hinde, John Hodgson, ed. (1868), Symeonis Dunelmensis Opera et Collectanea, Publications of the Surtees Society; volume 51, Durham: Surtees Society/ Andrews and Co
- Stevenson, Joseph (tr.). Church Historians of England. 8 vols: vol. 3 (part 2: The Historical Works of Simeon of Durham). London, 1853. 425-617. Google Books.
- Arnold, Thomas (ed.). Symeonis Monachi Opera Omnia. 2 vols: vol 2. London, 1885. 1-283.
- Hart, Cyril R. (ed. and tr.). Byrhtferth’s Northumbrian Chronicle: An Edition and Translation of the Old English and Latin Annals. The Early Chronicles of England 2. Edwin Mellen Press, 2006. Edition and translation of the first five sections.
