= David Rollason =

British historian

David W. Rollason is an English historian and medievalist. He is a Professor in history at Durham University. He specialises in the cult of saints in Anglo-Saxon England, the history of Northumbria and in the historical writings of Durham, most notably producing a modern edition and translation of the Libellus de exordio and co-operating on an edition of the Durham Liber Vitae.

Outside of his academic interests, David Rollason is a keen cyclist, cycling 175 miles (282 km) from Edinburgh to Seaton Delaval to raise money to assist the National Trust in their purchase of Seaton Delaval Hall.

== Selected publications ==
- The Mildrith Legend: A Study in Early Medieval Hagiography in England (1982)
- ed. with G. Bonner and C. Stancliffe St Cuthbert, his Cult and his Community to AD 1200 (1989)
- Saints and Relics in Anglo-Saxon England (1989)
- with D. Gore & G. Fellows-Jensen, Sources for York History to AD 1100 (York, 1998)
- ed. & tr. Symeon of Durham. Libellus de exordio atque procursu istius, hoc est Dunhelmensis, ecclesie (Oxford, 2000)
- Bede and Germany (Jarrow Lecture, 2002)
- Northumbria 500-1100: Creation and Destruction of a Kingdom (Cambridge: Cambridge University Press, 2003) ISBN 0-521-04102-3.
- ed. with many others, The Durham Liber Vitae. British Library, MS Domitian A.VII, An Edition with Digital Facsimile, and Prosopographical and Linguistic Commentaries (British Library, 2007)
- Early Medieval Europe 300–1050: A Guide for Studying and Teaching, 2nd edn (Abingdon: Routledge, 2018)

== Sources ==
- University of Durham Staff Profile, 28 January 2008
