= Libellus de exordio =

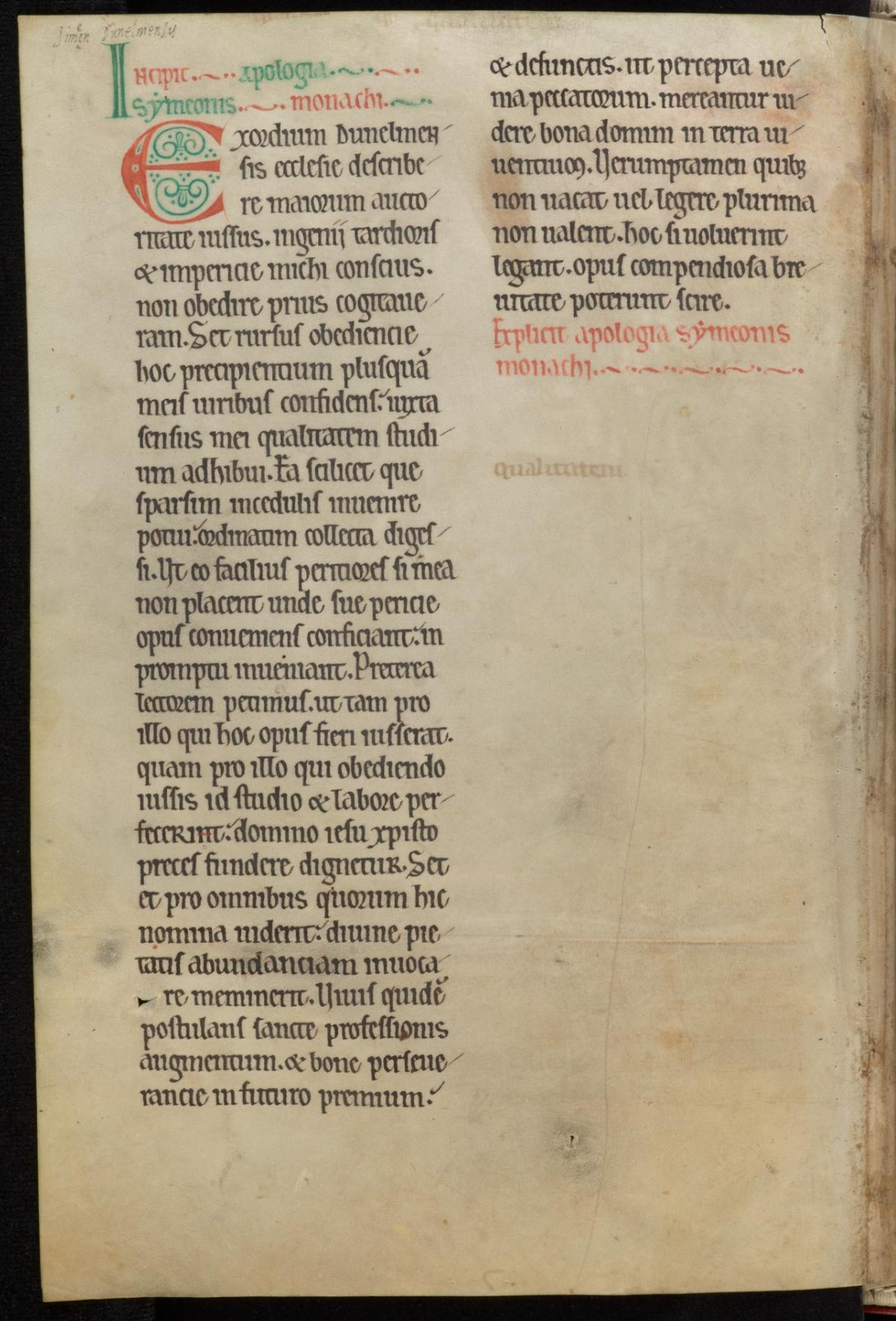
The preface to the Libellus de exordio in the Cambridge manuscript (MS Ff. i.27 p. 122)

The Libellus de exordio atque procursu istius, hoc est Dunhelmensis, ecclesie (English: Tract on the Origins and Progress of this the Church of Durham), in short Libellus de exordio, is a historical work of marked literary character composed and compiled in the early 12th-century and traditionally attributed to Symeon of Durham. It relates the history of bishopric and church of Durham and its predecessors at Lindisfarne and Chester-le-Street (Cunecacestre). It is sometimes also known as the Historia Dunelmensis ecclesiae (English: History of the Church of Durham).

The text survives in a number of medieval manuscripts, each with its own history, and containing different interpolations and notes. An English translation was published in 1885.

Its coverage extends from the beginning of Christianity among the English of Northumbria and the foundation of a bishopric at Lindisfarne, to the death of Bishop William of Saint-Calais in 1096.

== Manuscripts ==
The following is a list of manuscripts containing the text. Each manuscript has its own history, and contains different interpolations and notes. In brackets is the letter or letters used by Rollason, its latest editor, to refer to the manuscript in shorthand:

- Durham, University Library, Cosin V.II.6, (C)
- London, British Library, Cotton Faustina A.V, (F)
- Cambridge University Library, Ff. i.27, (Ca)
- Durham, Durham Cathedral Library, A.IV.36, (D')
- Oxford, Bodleian Library, Holkham misc. 25, (H)
- London, British Library, Cotton Titus A.II, (T)
- London, British Library, Cotton Vespasian A.VI, (V)
- York, Minster Library, XVI.I.12, (Y)
- Oxford, Bodleian Library, Fairfax 6, (Fx)
- Oxford, Bodleian Library, Laud misc. 700, (L)

== Authorship and dating ==
According to the Libellus's preface, the work was carried out on the orders of the monastic leadership of Durham Priory; probably it was Prior Turgot himself who commissioned it. The latest datable contemporary event mentioned in the core of the text (albeit obliquely) is the opening of the tomb of St Cuthbert for his translation into the new cathedral of Durham, on 29 August 1104. Manuscripts "C" and "F" are the earliest witnesses of the text, with "C" and "F" written in the same scriptorium while Turgot was prior of Durham, a position Turgot gave up before 1115 at the latest, but perhaps before 1107. The text can therefore be said to have been completed at some point between 1104 and 1107 x 1115.

The work is traditionally attributed to Symeon of Durham, the precentor of Durham Cathedral. The evidence for this are rubrics in manuscript "Ca" and a rubric in manuscript "H". These date respectively to the late 12th century and to around 1300. Though there is nothing in either "C" or "F", modern scholarship has largely reaffirmed the traditional authorship of the text. David Rollason, the text's most recent editor, sees Symeon's role more as that of a lead author and compiler than sole author.

== Published versions ==
The text has been published four times:

- Roger Twysden (ed.), Historiae Anglicanae Scriptores Decem, (London, 1652), vol. i
- Thomas Belford (ed.), Symeonis monachi Dunhelmensis, Libellus de exordio atque procursu Dunhelmensis ecclesie, (London, 1732)
- Thomas Arnold (ed.), Symeonis monachi Opera omnia, (Rolls Series lxxv; 2 vols., 1882—5), vol. i
- David Rollason (ed.), Libellus de exordio atque procursu istius, hoc est Dunhelmensis, ecclesie = Tract on the origins and progress of this the Church of Durham, (Oxford, 2000)

Twysden's edition was based wholly on "Ca". Bedford uses "C" mainly, though consulted "F" and "Ca" for variant readings and chapter headings. Arnold's edition made use of all the manuscripts except "D", "H" and "V".

An English translation has been published in The Church Historians of England, Vol. 3, Part 2, trans. by Joseph Stevenson (London: Seelays, 1855); reprinted as Simeon of Durham, A History of the Church of Durham, Felinfach: Llanerch Publications, 1993. Rollason's edition includes a facing English-language translation.

== Coverage and sources ==
The coverage of the Libellus de exordio extends from the beginning of Christianity among the English of Northumbria and the foundation of a bishopric at Lindisfarne, to the death of Bishop William of Saint-Calais in 1096. The Libellus demonstrates the continuity of Durham's history, and in particular it justifies William of Saint-Calais's expulsion of Durham's clerical community in 1083 in order to replace it with a group of Benedictine monks drawn from Wearmouth and Jarrow. What historical continuity the Libellus finds comes from the constant presence of the community's patron, Saint Cuthbert. The miracles worked in Cuthbert's name during the late Anglo-Saxon period were particularly flamboyant, and the Libellus contains engaging accounts of some of these, including the miracle of the three waves (when Cuthbert turned a portion of the Irish Sea into blood in order to prevent his followers from taking his relics out of England, see Libellus ii.11), the foundation of Durham (when Cuthbert's body, being moved across England on a cart, refused to be moved, signaling his desire to remain at Durham, see Libellus iii.1), and several picturesque deaths visited upon the enemies of Cuthbert's devotees.

The work consists of four books:

- Book I, from reign of Oswald (634—642) to reign of Ceolwulf (729—737)
- Book II, from the death of King Ceolwulf (737) to episcopate of Ealdhun (995)
- Book III, from episcopate of Ealdhun (995) to the murder of bishop Walcher (1080)
- Book IV, episcopate of William of Saint-Calais and the refoundation of the Priory (1081—1096)

Many earlier sources have been incorporated into the work, particularly the works of Bede and some now lost Northumbrian sources, including a set of "Northern Annals", a chronicle of the monastery of Durham, and what appear to be the oral reminiscences of the clerks who had been dislodged during William of Saint-Calais's reign.

== Extensions ==
There are two texts which constitute extensions of the Libellus de exordio. Firstly, six manuscripts contain a "summary" text which ends c. 1083, when a Benedictine priory was established at Durham. It is unclear if this was written before or after the Libellus de exordio.

Attached to the Libellus de exordio in eight manuscripts (all save "F" and "V") is an extension covering the period from the episcopate from Ranulf Flambard (1099-1128) to the installation of William de St Barbe (1143-1152). A variant version of this in "Ca" ends with the episcopate of Hugh le Puiset (1153-1195).
