= Symeon of Durham =

12th-century monk and chronicler

Symeon (or Simeon) of Durham (fl. c.1090 to c. 1128) was an English chronicler and a monk of Durham Priory. He is known for two historical works which are particularly valuable for northern affairs, about the church of Durham and the history of England.

== Biography ==
Symeon was a Benedictine monk at Durham Cathedral at the end of the eleventh century. He may have been one of 23 monks moved to Durham from the monastery at Jarrow by Bishop William of St Calais in 1083, but the historian Bernard Meehan thinks that it is more likely that Symeon entered Durham in the 1090s. He eventually became precentor of the priory, and examples of his handwriting appear to survive in several Durham books, including the Liber Vitae, the so-called Cantor's Book (whose text he would have had to keep up to date as part of his duties as precentor), and in copies of his own historical works.

== Works ==
Symeon was author of two historical works which are particularly valuable for northern affairs, the Libellus de Exordio atque Procursu istius, hoc est Dunelmensis, Ecclesie (The Little Book on the Origins and Progress of this Church, that is of Durham) and a historical compilation Historia regum Anglorum et Dacorum. The Libellus de Exordio, a history of the community of Durham (originally settled at Lindisfarne) from its inception to the year 1096, is by far his most important work. Composed between 1104 and 1107, Symeon's task (imposed on him by his monastic superiors) was to demonstrate the continuity of Durham's history despite the notable disruptions the community weathered during the Viking invasions and even more recently in the Norman Conquest. Symeon sought furthermore to justify William of Saint-Calais's expulsion of Durham's clerical community in 1083, in order to replace it with a group of Benedictine monks drawn from Wearmouth and Jarrow. Like earlier Durham writers, Symeon finds historical continuity between the major phases of the community's development in the constant presence of their patron, Saint Cuthbert. The miracles worked in Cuthbert's name during the late Anglo-Saxon period were particularly flamboyant, and the Libellus contains engaging accounts of some of these, including the miracle of the three waves (when Cuthbert turned a portion of the Irish Sea into blood in order to prevent his followers from taking his relics out of England, see Libellus ii.11), the foundation of Durham (when Cuthbert's body, being moved across England on a cart, refused to be moved, signalling his desire to remain at Durham, see Libellus iii.1), and several picturesque deaths visited upon the enemies of Cuthbert's devotees.

Several versions of the Libellus survive from the Middle Ages. Symeon's own revised copy can be found in Durham, University Library, Cosin V.II.6. It is this text which has been most often published. The Durham manuscript also contains two anonymous continuations of Symeon's work. The first carries the history from 1096 to the death of Ranulf Flambard (1129); the second extends from 1133 to 1144. A Cambridge manuscript (Cambridge University Library, Ff. i.27) contains a third continuation covering the years 1145-1154. Another manuscript (London, British Library, Cotton Faustina A.V) seems to represent the text of the Libellus before the revisions found in the Durham manuscript. A full list of manuscripts can be found on the Libellus de Exordio page.

About 1129 Symeon undertook to write a Historia regum Anglorum et Dacorum. This begins at the point where the Ecclesiastical History of Bede ends. Up to 957 Simeon merely copies some old Durham annals, not otherwise preserved, which are of value for northern history; from that point to 1119 he copies John of Worcester with certain interpolations. The section dealing with the years 1119-1129 is, however, an independent and practically contemporaneous narrative. Symeon writes, for his time, with ease and perspicuity; but his chief merit is that of a diligent collector and copyist.

Symeon also wrote brief biographies of the archbishops of York and a letter on the errors of Origen. Other writings have been attributed to his pen, but on no good authority. They are printed in the Historiae Anglicanae Scriptores Decem of Roger Twysden (1652). The most complete modern edition is that of Thomas Arnold (Rolls series, 2 vols., 1882–1885). For the Libellus, now see Rollason's 2000 edition.

The value of the Old Northumbrian Annals, which Symeon used for the Historia regum, has been discussed by John Hodgson-Hinde in the preface to his Symeonis Dunelmensis opera, vol. i. pp. xiv. ff. (1868); by R. Pauli in Forschungen zur deutschen Geschichte, xii. pp. 137 sqq. (Göttingen, 1872); and by William Stubbs in the introduction to Roger of Hoveden, vol. i. p. x. ("Rolls" series).

== Sources ==
- Symeon of Durham (2000). Rollason, David W. (ed.). Libellus de Exordio atque Procursu istius, hoc est Dunhelmensis, Ecclesie [Tract on the origins and progress of this the Church of Durham] (in Latin and English). Oxford: Clarendon Press. ISBN 0-19-820207-5.
