= St Mary and St Cuthbert, Chester-le-Street =

Coordinates: 54.855944°N 1.571972°W

St Mary and St Cuthbert
- Parish church of St Mary and St Cuthbert
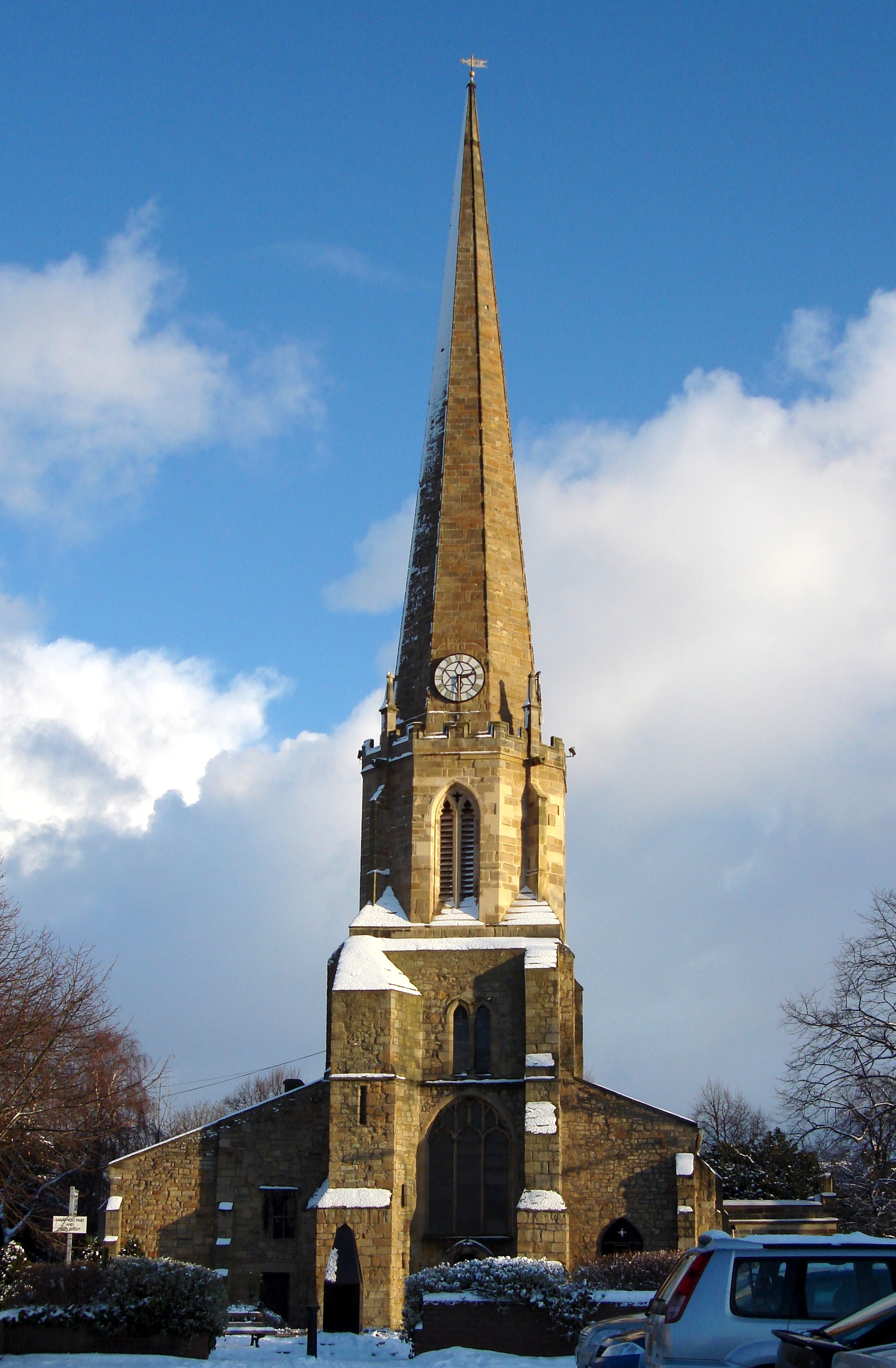

- Location of church in County Durham St Mary and St Cuthbert (Tyne and Wear)
- OS grid reference: NZ 27603 51316
- Location: Chester-le-Street, County Durham
- Country: England
- Denomination: Church of England
- Website: https://www.maryandcuthbert.org.uk

History
- Status: Parish church
- Dedication: St Mary and St Cuthbert

Architecture
- Heritage designation: Grade 1

Administration
- Diocese: Durham

Clergy
- Rector: Matthew Strand

The parish church of St Mary and St Cuthbert is a Church of England church in Chester-le-Street, County Durham, England. The site has been used for worship for over 1100 years; elements of the current building are over 950 years old. The oldest surviving translation of the Gospels into English was done here, by Aldred between 947 and 968, at a time when it served as the centre of Christianity from Lothian to Teesside.

== St Cuthbert's community ==
The church was established to house the body of Cuthbert of Lindisfarne, Bishop of Lindisfarne from 684 to 687. After his death he became one of the most venerated saints of the time, with a significant cultus and the Venerable Bede writing both a verse and prose biography of him. So when driven out of Lindisfarne by Viking raids in 875 the monks took St Cuthbert's coffin along with other valuable items. They wandered for seven years before eventually settling at Chester-le-Street (then called Cunecaster or Conceastre), at the site of the old Roman fort of Concangis, in 883, on land granted to them by Guthred.

They built a wooden church and shrine for St Cuthbert's relics, dedicating it to St Mary and St Cuthbert. Though there was no shortage of stone in the ruins of Concangis they did not build a stone church; it has been suggested they did not intend to stay for as long as they eventually did. It was built within the Roman fort, which although abandoned over five hundred years before may have still offered some protection, as well as access north and south along Cade's Road and to the sea by the River Wear.

This was also a cathedral as it contained the seat of the bishop, for the diocese (sometimes known as Lindisfarne and sometimes as Cuncacestre the Latin name for Chester-le-Street) stretching between the boundaries of Danelaw at Teesside in the south, of Alba at Lothian in the north and the Irish Sea in the west. The bishop's authority was confirmed by Alfred the Great, and for the next 112 years the community was based here, visited by kings Æthelstan and Edmund, who both left gifts for the community, to add to the treasures brought from Lindisfarne.

Most notable among their treasures were the Lindisfarne Gospels, created in Lindisfarne around 715. While here they were translated from Latin into English, sometime between 947 and 968, by Aldred writing a gloss in Old English above the text, making them the oldest surviving English translation of the Gospels. The Gospels and St Cuthbert's coffin were here until 995, when renewed Viking raids drove the monks out, to Ripon before returning to the more easily defended Durham, where they eventually built a stone cathedral around St Cuthbert's remains. The wooden church remained in place until replaced by a stone church in the mid 11th century.

== Church building ==
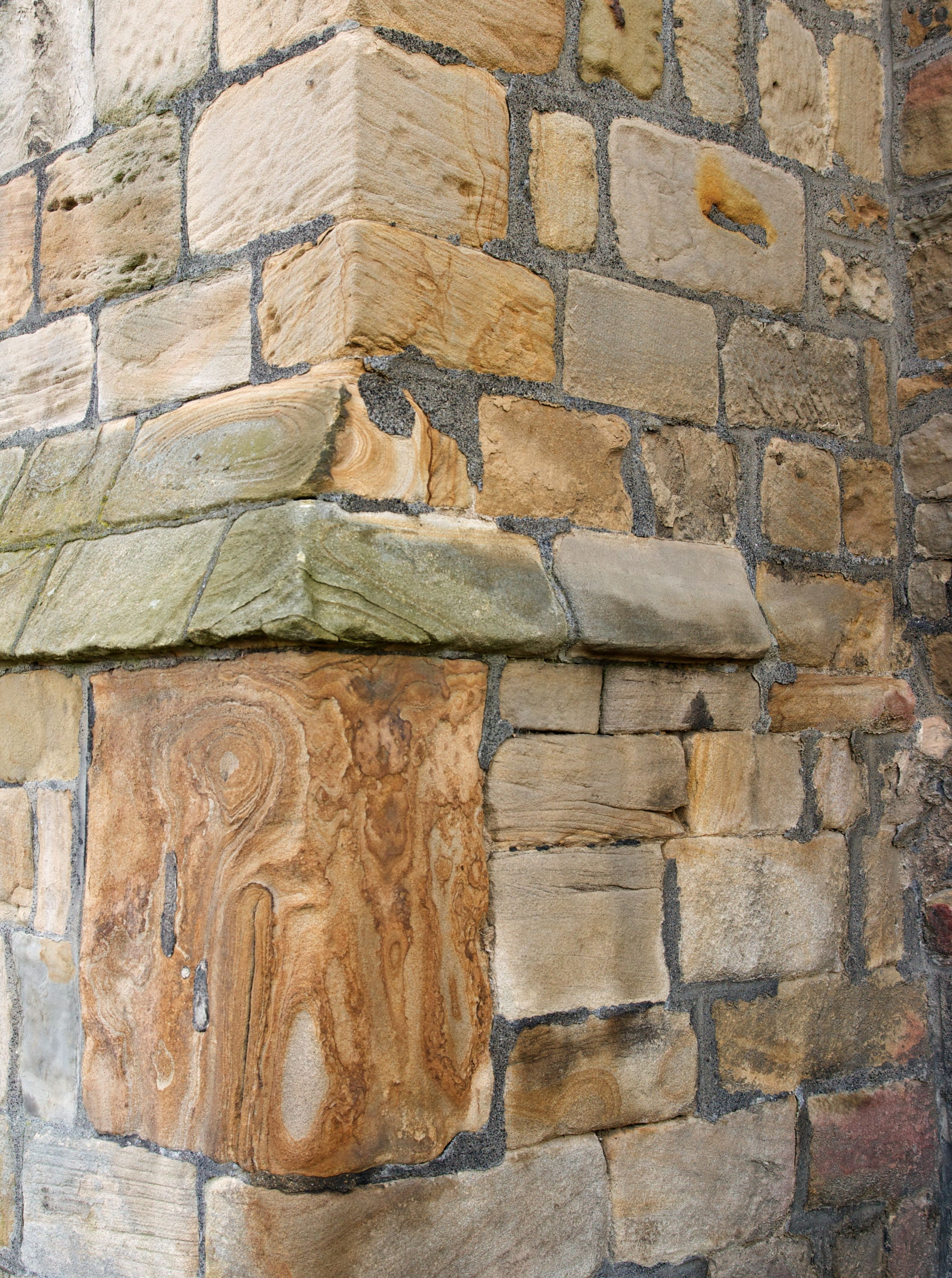
Stones with lewis holes in a front buttress at bottom left and top right (now filled with mortar).

The oldest parts of the building that can be dated, to 1056 when a stone church was built to replace the wooden shrine to St Cuthbert, are the walls of the chancel and the two largest pillars now near the centre of the nave. The church then would have been a third shorter and much narrower, as wide as the chancel today. Lewis holes visible in two stones on a front buttress show that Roman stone was used in later construction.

The church was extended around 1267 with the nave, the lower part of the tower and east wall with sedilia all dating from this time. In 1286 it was made a collegiate church, with a dean, seven canons, five chaplains and three deacons, supported by tithes from extensive endowments throughout a large parish. Around 1383 an anchorage was added in one corner of the church, to be used by six (male) anchorites until 1547, when it was extended. It is now the Ankers House Museum. A 158 feet (48 m) spire and belfry and three bells were added in 1409, one of which is still in use.

The collegiate church was dissolved during the Reformation and the church became a parish church with reduced wealth and influence. In subsequent years much of the money for building came from donations, with those of the Lumley and Lambton families particularly notable. John Lumley contributed a set of family effigies that now lie along the north wall in 1595. A new south porch was added in 1742, while in 1829 a Lambton family pew by Ignatius Bonomi was added above a new vault (which once held the remains of John Lambton) with an external staircase.

In 1862 major restorations were undertaken, and the church became a rectory with the installation of an organ in 1865, later restored by Harrison & Harrison. To celebrate the church's millennium a screen was installed in 1883, along with other alterations. In 1927 a reredos, panelling and a bishop's throne by Sir Charles Nicholson and three panels, Journey of St Cuthbert's body, by his brother Archibald Keightley Nicholson were added. The church became a Grade I listed building in 1950, and doors were added to the South Porch in 1964.

Details of the exterior
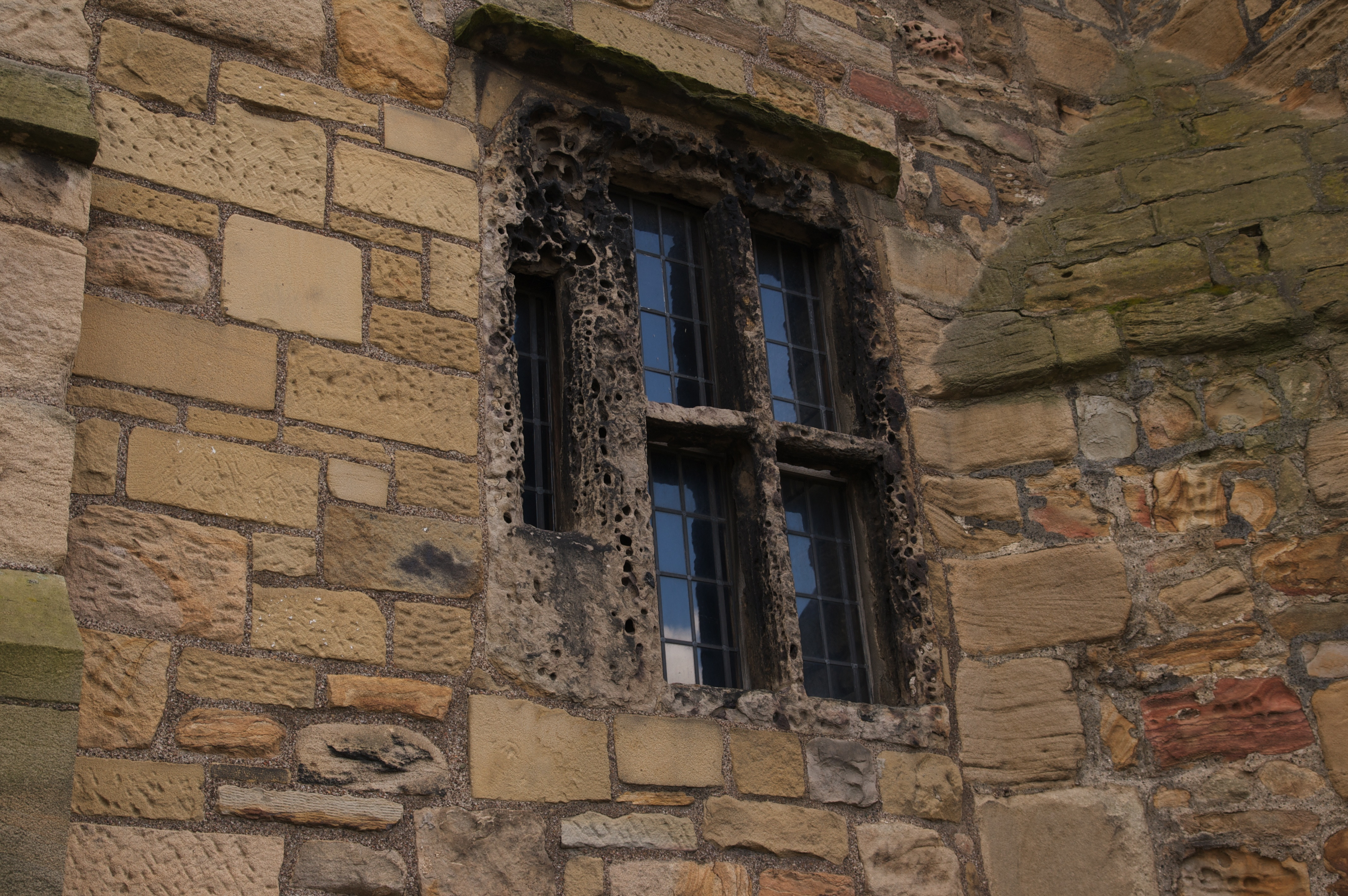
Anchorage window

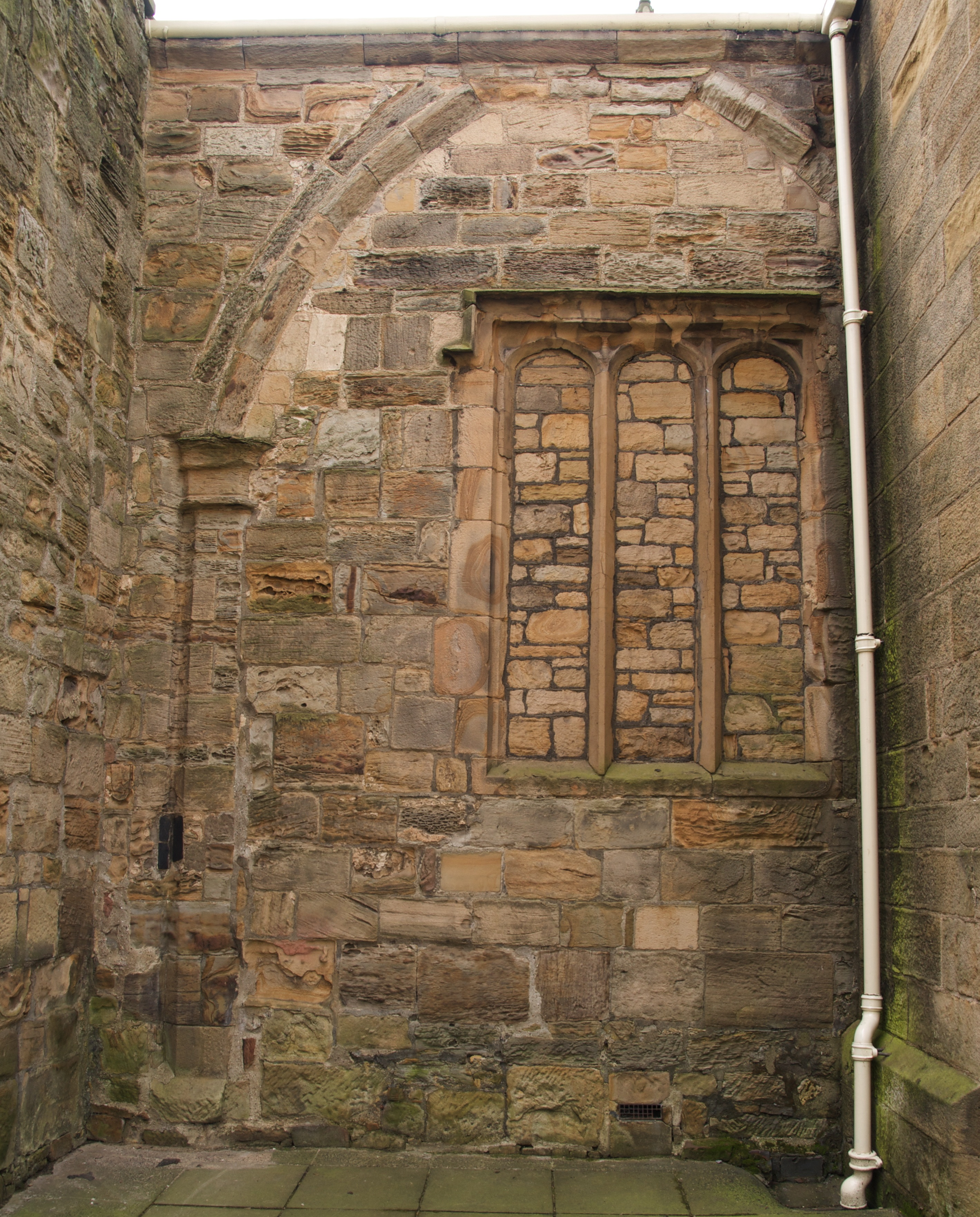
North wall

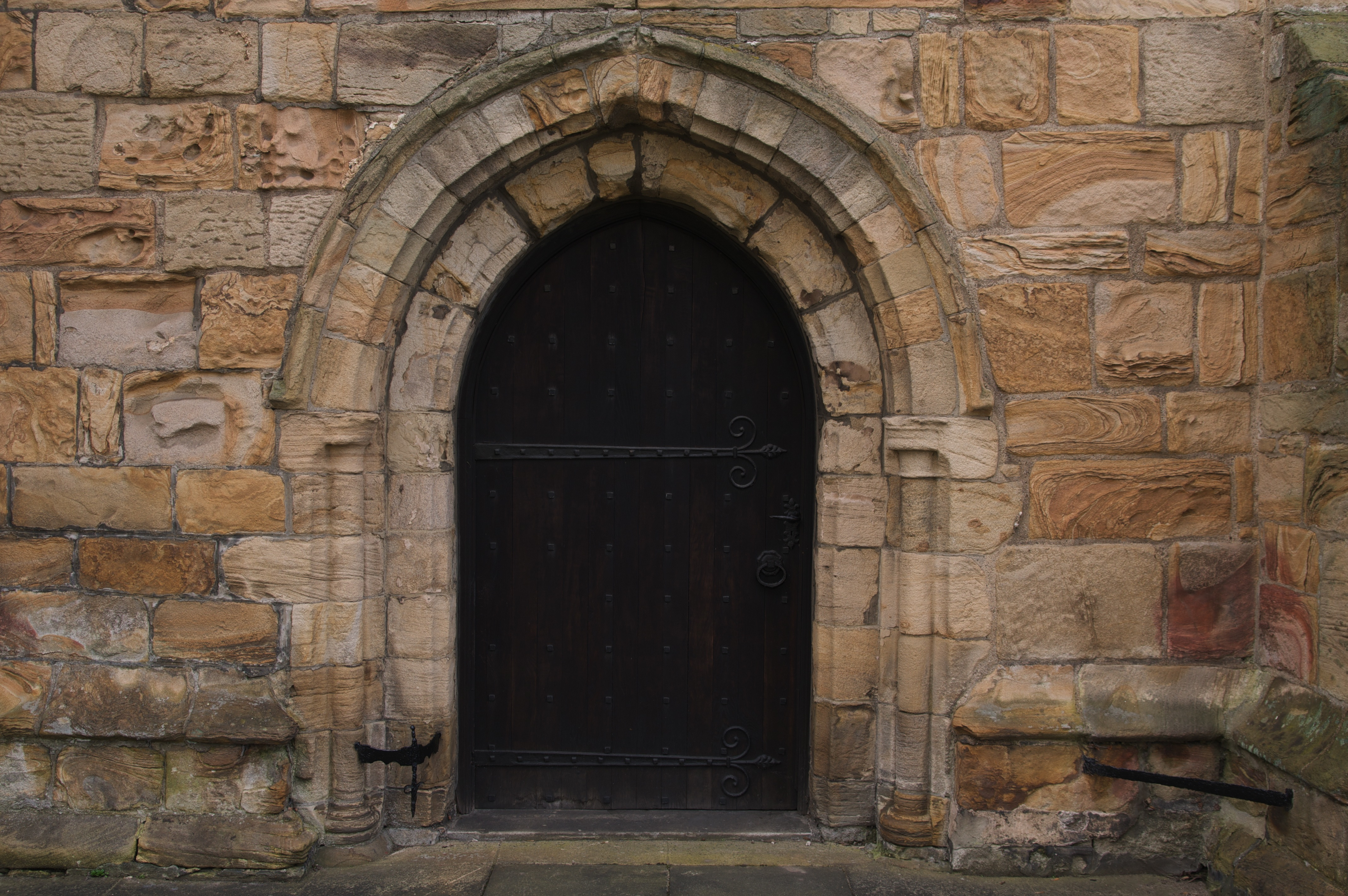
North door

== List of incumbents ==
Bishops

- Eardulf (883-900)
- Cutheard (900-915)
- Tilred (915-928)
- Wigred
- Utchred
- Sexhelm (947)
- Aldred
- Elfsig
- Aldune

Deans

- Mervin
- Waleran
- Iolanus
- Robert
- Waleran
- Robert le Bursar
- Walter de Clifford
- Magister Alan de Esingwalde

Rectors

- William de Marclan
- Roger de Gillyng
- John de Sculthorpe
- John de Kyngeston
- John de Derby
- Thomas de Hexham
- John de Ashbourn
- John de Newton
- John Bawdwyn
- John Balswell
- Robert Chamber
- Thomas Keye
- Richard Layton
- William Warren

Perpetual Curates

- George Brome
- William Massey
- Bryan Adamson
- Thomas Lyddall
- Robert Willis
- Robert Hunter
- William Hume
- Edmund Browne
- Nicholas Conyers
- Nathaniel Chilton
- William Lambe
- Francis Milbanke
- Lewis Powell
- John Nelson
- William Nesfield (1789-1828)
- Thomas Hyde Ripley (1828-1865)
- Robert Kirwood (1865-1872)
- Canon William Octavius Blunt (1872-1895)
- Alrued Bayford de Moleyns (1895-1919)
- Canon Frank Hilton Jackson (1919-1936)
- Hubert Seed Wilkinson (1936-1940)
- Canon Charles Reginald Appleton (1940-1958)
- Anthony Spurr (1959-1971)
- Patrick Allen Blair (1971-1977)
- Ian Bunting (1978-1987)

== Burials ==
- John Lambton, 1st Earl of Durham
- Ralph de Lumley, 1st Baron Lumley

== In art and literature ==
The Lumley effigies are reflected upon in Letitia Elizabeth Landon's poetical illustration The Aisle of Tombs to an engraving of a painting by Thomas Allom in Fisher's Drawing Room Scrap Book, 1836: 'All their meaner part hath perished, In the earth at rest; And the present hour hath cherished What of them was best.'

== Millenary festival ==
A thousand years! What a crowd of associations are suggested by these words. What thronging memories of the past, what solemn reflections of the present, what anxious hopes and fears for the future. A thousand years! What changes have taken place in this long lapse of time. How many nations have risen and fallen; how many tongues have died out; how many famous names have been forgotten. A thousand years ago!

— J. B. Lightfoot, Bishop of Durham, Sermon at the church Millenary Festival, 18 July 1883

In 1883 the thousandth anniversary of the founding of the church was celebrated, from 18 July to 5 August. To mark the occasion the church was given a major facelift, with some new oak stalls and an oak screen for the chancel, a new dossal and other hangings from designs by C. E. Kempe, a new pulpit given by the Earl of Scarbrough, a new marble pavement and other improvements, many of them provided as gifts for the occasion. Many other events took place over the festival, and a book was published to mark the church's first thousand years. The Bishop of Durham, J. B. Lightfoot attended and took part in the celebrations, including holding a service for the dedication of the new bells.

Images from 1883
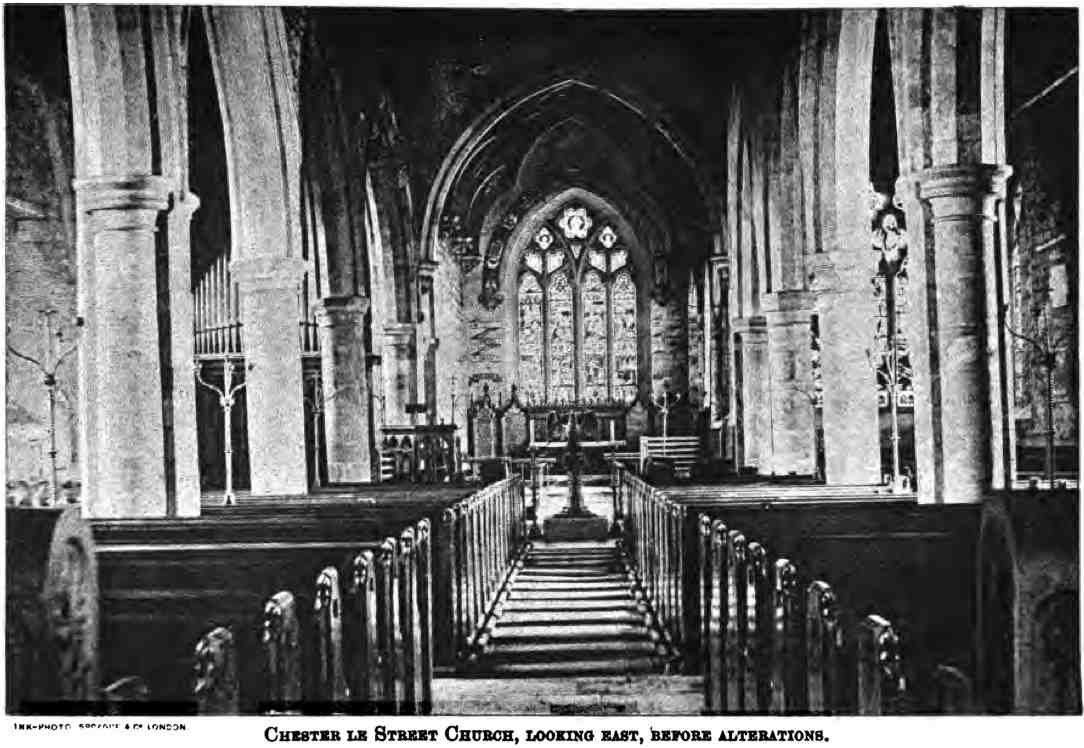
The interior before renovations done in 1883.

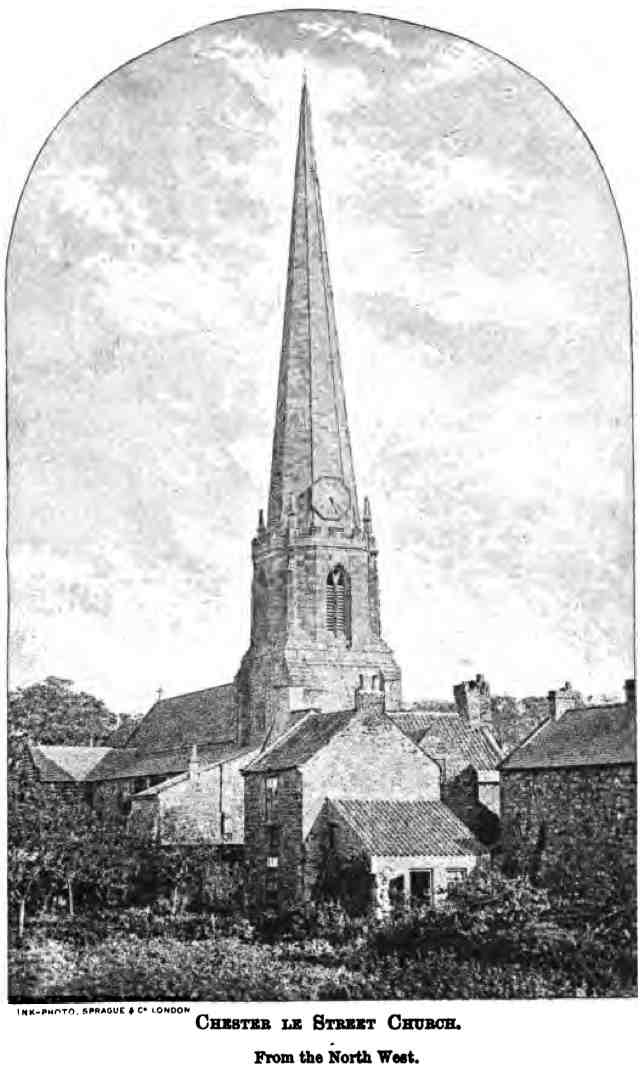
The church from the northwest.

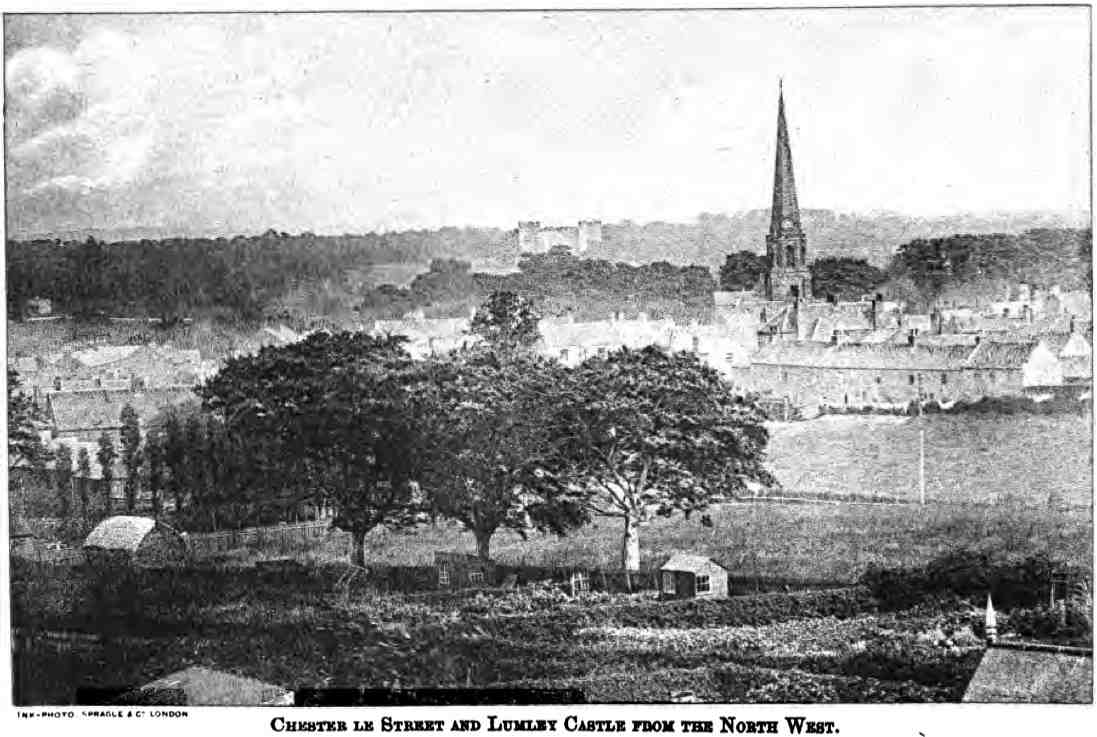
A view over Chester-le-Street towards Lumley Castle.

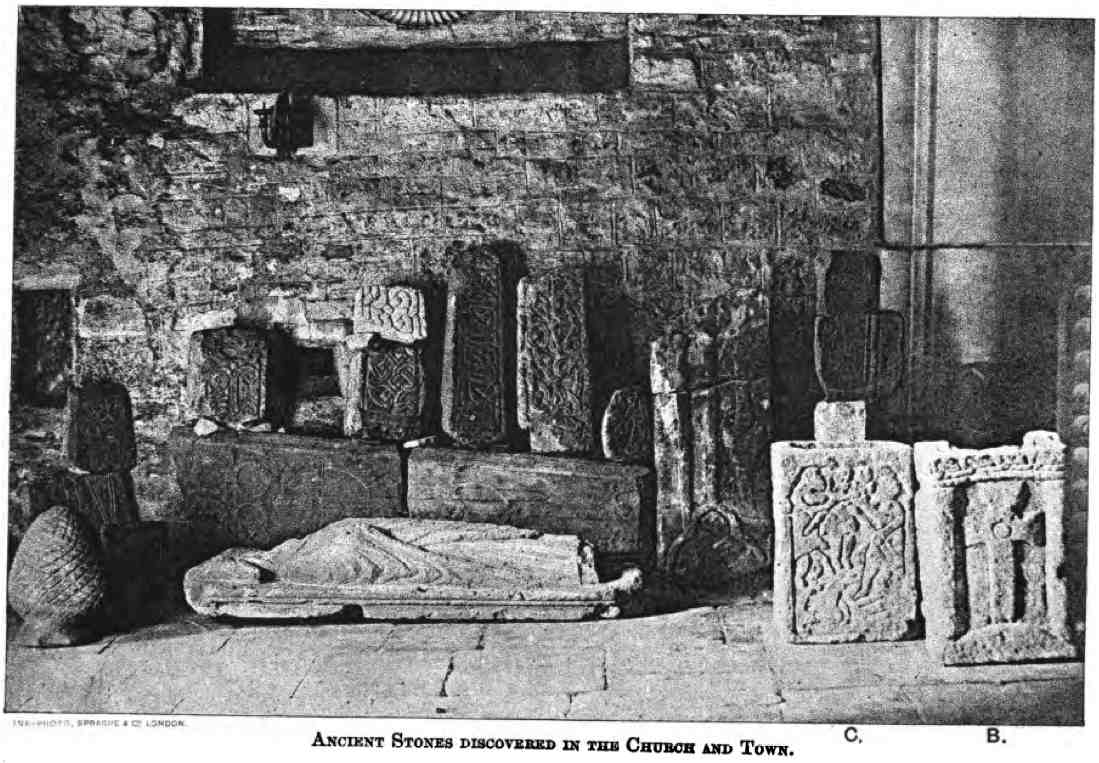
Stones found at the church and nearby, now at The Ankers House.

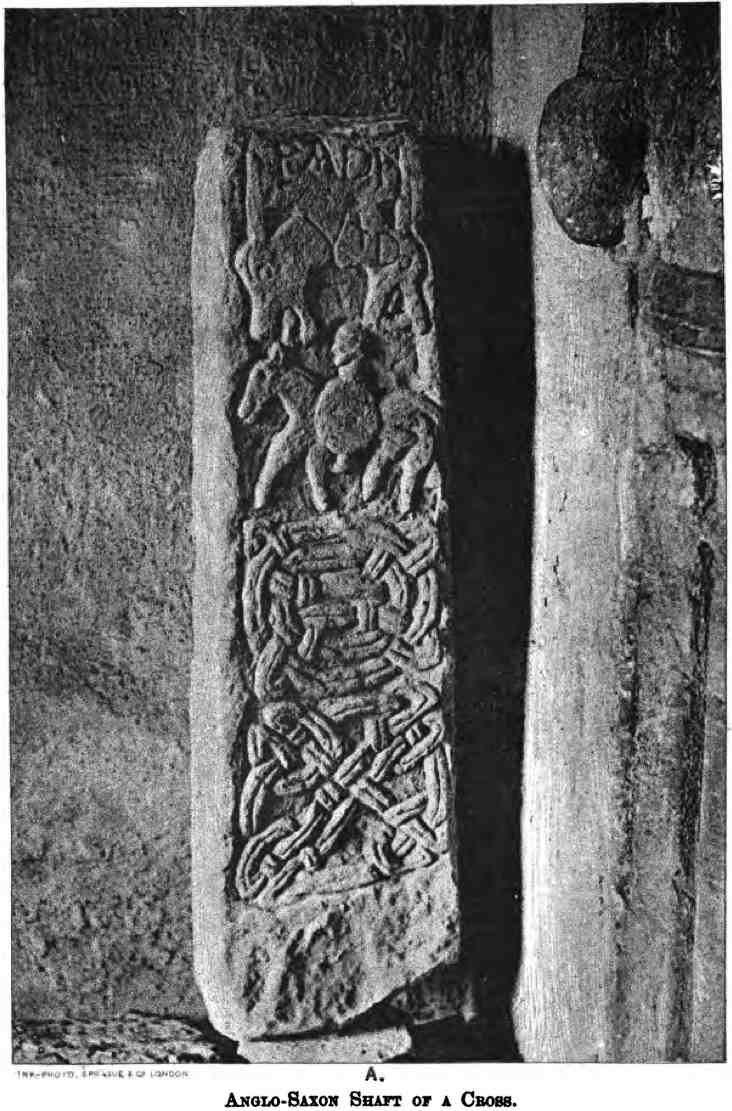
The shaft of an Anglo-Saxon cross, now at The Ankers house.

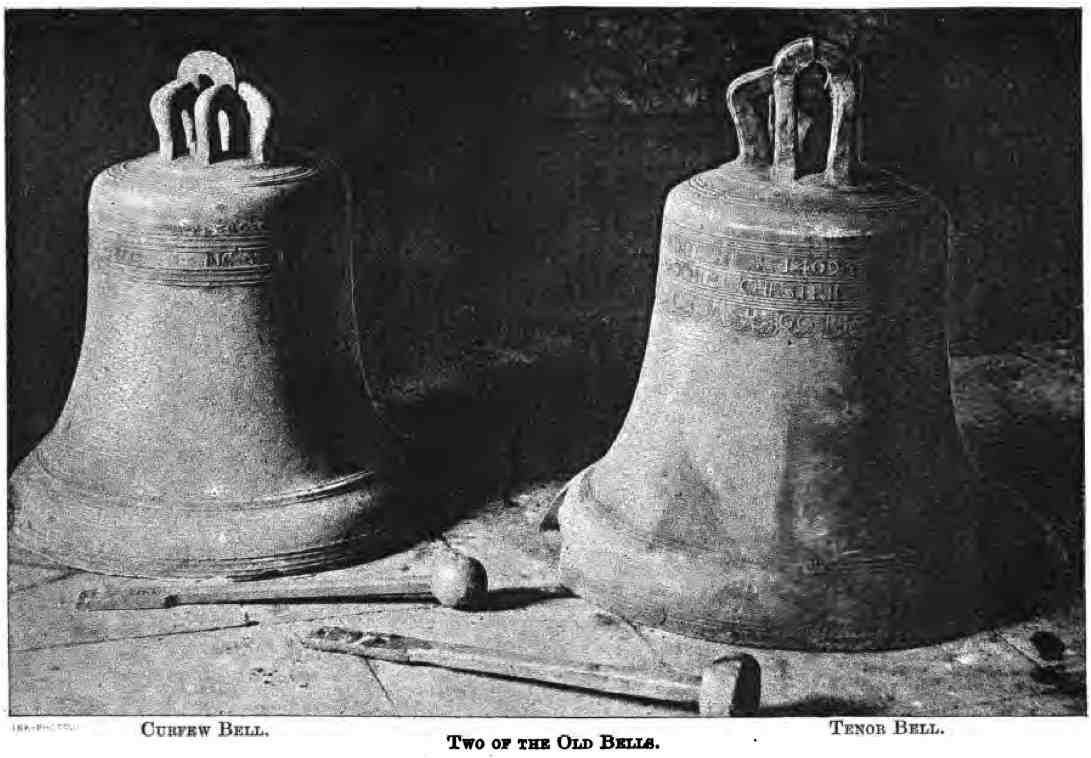
Two of the original bells (cast in 1409).

== Bells ==
The belfry at the church dates back over 600 years and originally housed three bells. A new ring of six was cast by John Taylor & Co of Loughborough in 1883; two of the original bells were melted down and the metal included in the new ring. In 1908 two further bells (again by Taylor's) were added to the front of the ring to give eight, hung for change ringing. One of the original bells from 1409 still survives as an "odd ninth" and is used as a service bell: it is recognised as having national historic importance. The bells are used before services on Sundays, with practice on Friday evenings.

== Lindisfarne Gospels ==
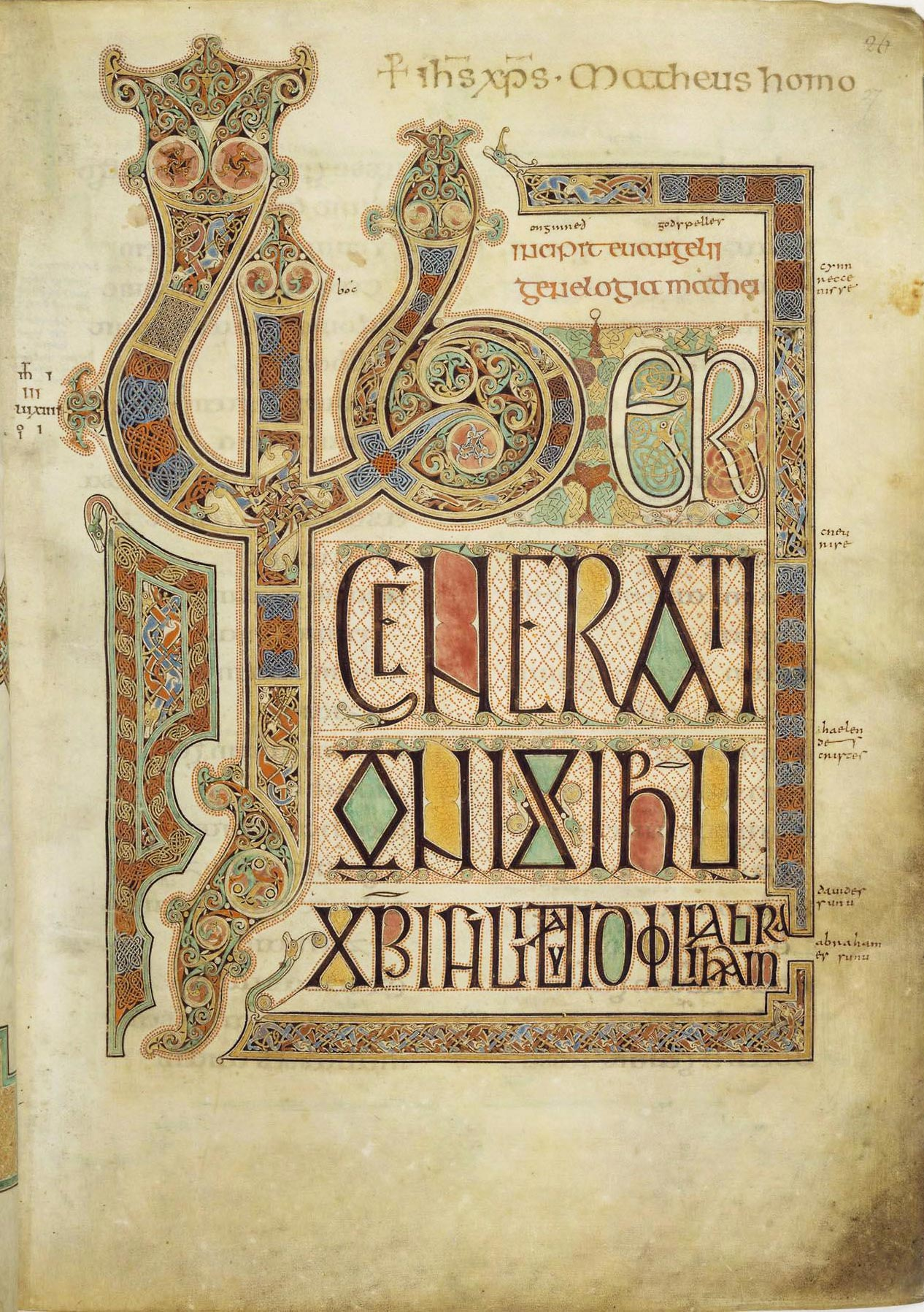
Opening page the Gospel of Matthew from the Lindisfarne Gospels.

The Lindisfarne Gospels were kept at Durham until 1539, when during the Dissolution of the Monasteries St Cuthbert's shrine there was looted and they were taken to London. Today they are kept at the British Library, but a facsimile copy is kept at the church and can be viewed when the church is open.

== Anchorage and Ankers House Museum ==
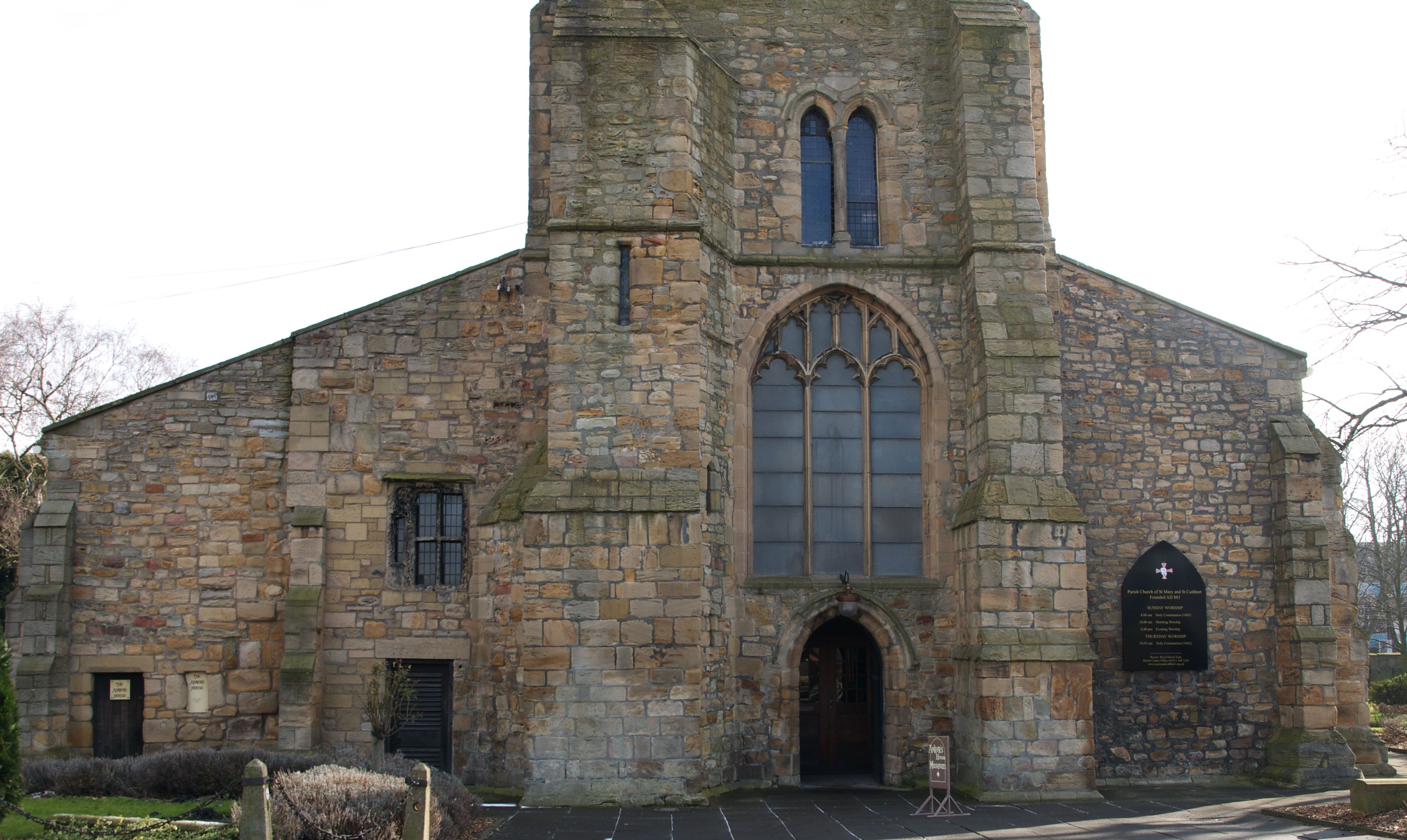
Front view of the church, with Ankers House Museum on the left.

Attached to the church is the former anchorage, one of the few surviving to this day and described as the most complete example of its kind in England. It was created by blocking off one corner of a church in the late 14th century, with an extra room added externally in the 16th century. Originally it was on two levels, but the floor was removed at some point to allow more space and light. From 1383 to 1547 it was occupied by six anchorites, each being walled in to the anchorage for life, able to watch services through a squint into the church which looks down onto a side altar, being fed through another slit to the outside.

It was used in this way until the reformation. The anchorage then became a place sporadically occupied by the poor or members of the church. In 1986 it became the Ankers House Museum, one of the smallest museums in the UK. It shows the conditions that an anchorite lived in when it was occupied, as well as containing Roman, Anglo-Saxon and medieval items found on the site.
