= List of Northumbrian saints =

This list of Northumbrian saints includes Christian saints with strong connections to the medieval Kingdom of Northumbria, either because they were of local origin and ethnicity (chiefly Anglian) or because they travelled to Northumbria from their own homeland and became noted in their hagiography for work there. Northumbria existed from the 7th–10th centuries in what is now northern England, along with areas of the Scottish Borders and the Lothian. Its chief ecclesiastical centre was York. Northumbria originally extended from North of the Humber to the Firth of Forth, although the borders were ever expanding, and land South of the Humber was part of the Kingdom of Northumbria, such as Lindsey. Also lands north of The Firth of Forth.

During the reign of king Oswald of Northumbria, an Irish monk Aidan was invited to reconvert the area to Christianity. He and other Irish monks achieved this and subsequently the Northumbrians helped to reconvert much of the rest of England and also parts of the European continent.

== Saints ==
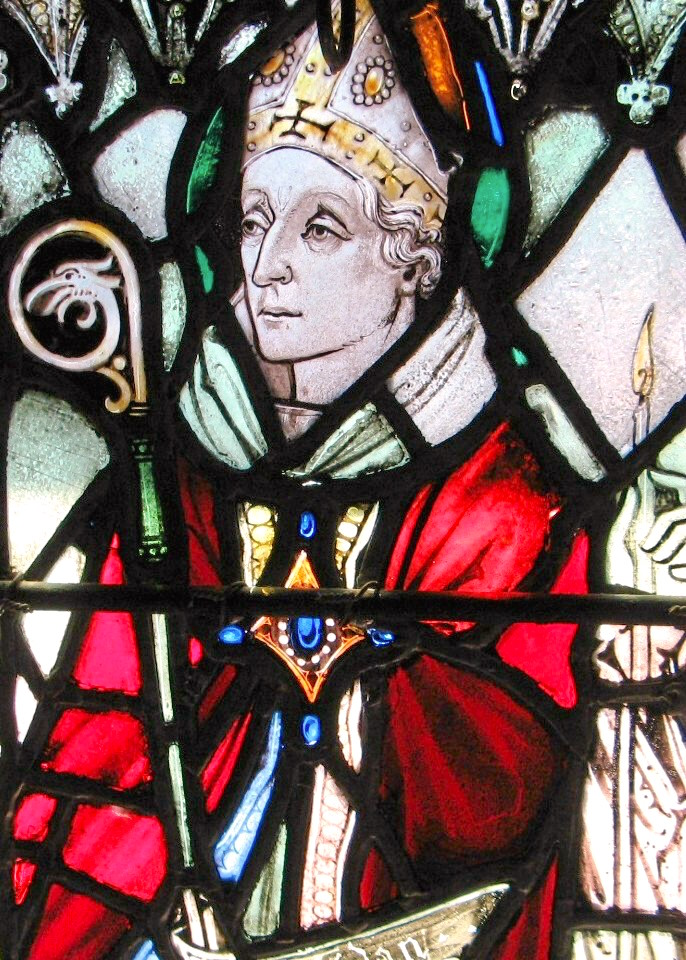
Saint Aidan

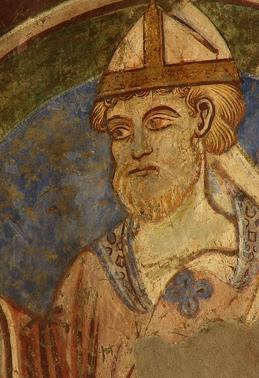
Saint Cuthbert

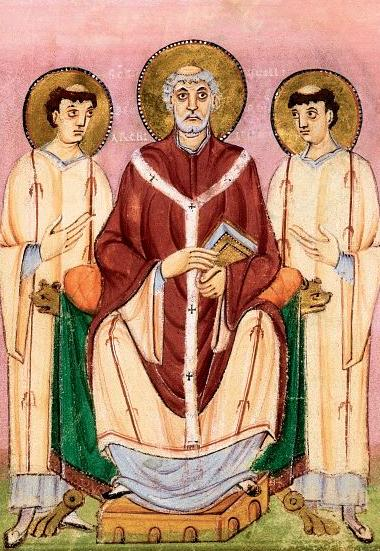
Saint Willibrord

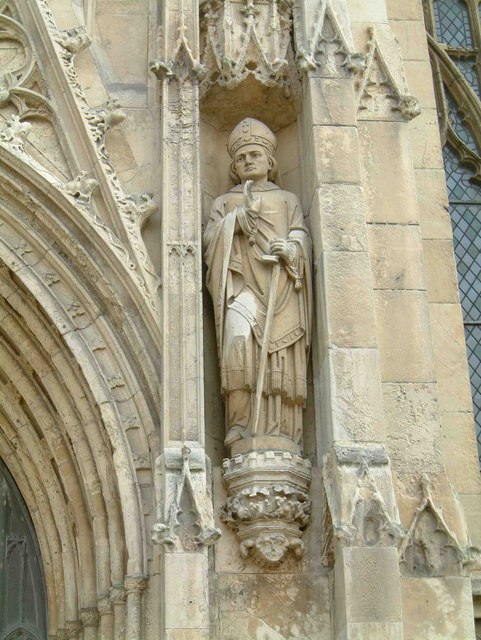
Saint John of Beverley

Name	Born	Life	Comments	Feast	Reference
Edwin of Northumbria	Deira, Northumbria	586—632	King of Northumbria, converted to Christianity from paganism.	12 October	
Paulinus of York	Rome	died 644	First bishop of the refounded diocese of York; Converted Edwin to Christianity.	10 October	
Oswald of Northumbria	Deira, Northumbria	604—642	King of Northumbria, invited Aidan to reconvert his kingdom to Christianity.	5 August	
Aidan of Lindisfarne	Connacht, Ireland	died 651	First Bishop of Lindisfarne, invited by Oswald to reconvert Northumbria.	31 August	
Oswine of Deira	Deira, Northumbria	died 651	King of Deira, died "at least for the justice of Christ".	20 August	
Honorius of Canterbury	Rome	died 653	accompanied Paulinus, wrote to Pope to raise York into archbishoporic.	30 September	
Everilda	Wessex		Founder of Everingham. Wessex princess, became a nun in Northumbria.	9 July	
Finan of Lindisfarne	Ireland	died 661	Bishop of Lindisfarne, converted Sigeberht II of Essex and Peada of Mercia.	9 February	
Colmán of Lindisfarne	Ireland	605—675	Bishop of Lindisfarne, active during time of the Synod of Whitby.	8 August	
Balin	Northumbria		Brother of Gerald of Mayo, disciple of Colmán, moved to Connacht.	3 September	
Tuda of Lindisfarne	Ireland	died 664	Bishop of Lindisfarne, staunch supporter of Latin calculations of Easter.	21 October	
Boisil	Northumbria	died 664	Founder of Melrose, abbot who was the teacher of Cuthbert.	7 July	
Hilda of Whitby	Deira, Northumbria	614—680	Founder of Whitby, abbess and part of the Deiran royal family.	17 November	
Æbbe the Elder	Northumbria	615—683	Founder of Ebchester and St Abb's Head, abbess and Bernician princess.	25 August	
Eata of Hexham	Northumbria	died 686	Bishop of Lindisfarne, earlier abbot, first non-Irishman to hold the bishopric.	26 October	
Cedd	Northumbria	620—664	Bishop of London, brother of Chad, credited with reconversion of Essex.	26 October	
James the Deacon	Rome		accompanied Paulinus, taught people Gregorian chant and plain song.	11 October	
Chad of Mercia	Northumbria	died 672	Bishop of York, brother of Cedd, credited with Christianisation of Mercia.	2 March	
Cædmon	Whitby, Northumbria		Earliest English poet, herdsman who became a devoted monk		
Hereswitha	Deira, Northumbria		sister of Hilda of Whitby, retired to Gaul to lead religious life.	3 September	
Begu	Hackness, Northumbria	died 690	Nun at Whitby, witnessed miracle of Hilda.	31 October	
The Two Ewalds	Northumbria	died 695	missionaries Ewald the Black and Ewald the Fair, martyred in Old Saxony.	3 October	
Eanflæd of Bernicia	Deira, Northumbria	626—704	Queen of Bernicia, later Abbess of Whitby succeeding Hilda.	24 November	
Benedict Biscop	Northumbria	628—690	Founder of Monkwearmouth and Jarrow, Benedictine abbot.	12 January	
Bosa of York	Northumbria	died 705	Bishop of York, educated as a scholar at Whitby Abbey under Hilda.	9 March	
Hædde	Headingley, Northumbria	died 705	Bishop of Winchester, was also a monk at Whitby Abbey.	7 July	
Wilfrid	Northumbria	633—709	Founder of Ripon and Preston, Bishop of York, advocate of Latin Easter.	24 April	
Cuthbert	Dunbar, Northumbria	634—687	Bishop of Lindisfarne, priest and hermit, patron saint of Northumbria	20 March	
Ceolfrith	Northumbria	642—716	Abbot of Wearmouth, major contributor to the project Codex Amiatinus.	25 September	
Easterwine	Northumbria	650—686	Abbot of Wearmouth, previously a soldier in earlier life.	7 March	
Eadberht of Lindisfarne	Northumbria	died 698	Bishop of Lindisfarne, favoured poverty, long periods of solitude and devotion.	6 May	
Ælfflæd of Whitby	Deira, Northumbria	654—713	Daughter of king Oswiu of Northumbria and Eanflæd, Abbess of Whitby.	8 February	
Willibrord	Northumbria	658—739	Founder of Utrecht, missionary known as Apostle of the Frisians.	7 November	
Acca of Hexham	Northumbria	660—740	Bishop of Hexham, strong promoter of education.	20 October	
Suitbert of Kaiserwerdt	Northumbria	died 713	Founder of Kaiserswerth, joined Willibrord's Frisian mission.	1 March	
Egbert of Northumbria	Northumbria	died 729	monk at the Abbey of Rathmelsigi, arranged Willibrord's Frisian mission.	24 April	
Adalbert of Egmond	Northumbria		monk at the Abbey of Rathmelsigi, joined Willibrord's Frisian mission.	25 June	
John of Beverley	Harpham, Northumbria	died 721	Founder of Beverley, Bishop of Hexham and then Bishop of York.	7 May	
Eadfrith of Lindisfarne	Northumbria	died 721	Bishop of Lindisfarne, said to have been artist of the Lindisfarne Gospels.	4 June	
Bede	Jarrow, Northumbria	672—735	author of History of the English People, recognised Doctor of the Church.	25 May	
Æthelwold of Lindisfarne	Northumbria	died 740	Bishop of Lindisfarne, oversaw binding of the raw Lindisfarne Gospels.	12 February	
Wilfrid II	Whitby, Northumbria	died 745	Bishop of York, described as a very holy man, and interested in education.	29 April	
Osana	Deira, Northumbria	698—750	sister of Osred I of Northumbria, known for miraculous grave flagellation.	18 June	
Baldred of Tyninghame	Ireland	died 757	Hermit and priest, moved to Lindisfarne, known as Apostle of the Lothians.	6 March	
Billfrith	Northumbria	died 758	Benedictine hermit, silversmith who bound the Lindisfarne Gospels.	6 March	
Æthelwold of Farne	Northumbria		Hermit who lived on Inner Farne, priest and a monk at Ripon Abbey.	23 March	
Lebuinus	Ripon, Northumbria	died 773	Founder of Deventer, an Apostle of the Frisians.	12 November	
Alcmund of Hexham	Northumbria	died 781	Bishop of Hexham. Considered a saint after death.	7 September	
Ælfwald I of Northumbria	Northumbria	died 788	King of Northumbria. Considered a saint at Hexham Abbey after murder.		
Willehad of Bremen	Northumbria	735—789	First Bishop of Bremen, missionary to the Saxons under Charlemagne.	13 July	
Alkelda	Northumbria	died 800	princess and nun, strangled by Viking women during raid at Middleham.	28 March	
Alcmund of Derby	Northumbria	died 800	Northumbrian prince, son of king Alhred of Northumbria.	19 March	
Bega	Ireland		princess from Ireland, valued virginity, moved to Northumbria to avoid pirates.	7 November	
Æbbe of Coldingham	Northumbria	died 870	Founder of Coldingham, origin of cutting off the nose to spite the face.	25 August	

== See also ==
- List of Anglo-Saxon saints
- List of Welsh saints
- List of Cornish saints
- List of Irish saints
- List of saints of the Canary Islands
