= Heathured =

Heathured, or variants, is an Anglo-Saxon name borne by several people:

- Heathwred of Lindisfarne (died 821), Bishop of Lindisfarne
- Heathored of Whithorn (fl. 833), Northumbrian Bishop of Whithorn
- Heathured of Worcester (died 798 or 800), Bishop of Worcester
