= Æthelwold =

Æthelwold was a common Anglo Saxon name. It may refer to:

== Royalty and nobility ==
- King Æthelwold of Deira, King of Deira, d. 655
- King Æthelwold of East Anglia, King of East Anglia, d. 664
- King Æthelwold Moll of Northumbria, King of Northumbria, d. post-765
- Æthelwold ætheling, son of King Æthelred of Wessex, d. 902
- Æthelwald, Ealdorman of East Anglia, son of Æthelstan Half-King, d. 962

== Saints ==
- Saint Æthelwold (hermit), hermit on Inner Farne, d. 699; feast kept 23 March
- Saint Æthelwold (bishop of Lindisfarne), Abbot of Melrose and Bishop of Lindisfarne, d. 740; feast kept 12 February
- Saint Æthelwold of Winchester, Bishop of Winchester, d. 984; feast kept 1 August

== Other clerics ==
- Æthelweald, Bishop of Dunwich, mid-9th century
- Æthelwold (bishop of Lichfield), Bishop of Lichfield, d. 845
- Æthelwold (bishop of Dorchester), Bishop of Dorchester, d. 950
- Æthelwold II (bishop of Winchester), Bishop of Winchester, d. 1012
- Æthelwold (bishop of Carlisle), Bishop of Carlisle, d. 1157
