= Cynewulf (disambiguation) =

Cynewulf may refer to:

- Cynewulf (8th century), Anglo-Saxon poet
- Cynewulf of Lindisfarne (died 783), Bishop of Lindisfarne from 740 to 780
- Cynewulf of Wessex (died 786), King of Wessex from 757 to 786
