= Heathored of Whithorn =

9th-century Bishop of Whithorn

Heathored of Whithorn is sometimes given as the Northumbrian Bishop of Whithorn (Latin: Candida Casa), following the demise of Bishop Beadwulf. He is possibly the last known Anglo-Saxon Bishop of Whithorn. His name occurs for the last time around 833; no other bishop at Whithorn is known until the accession around three centuries later of Gille Aldan. It is sometimes thought that he may be the same man as Bishop Heathwred of Lindisfarne.

== Controversy ==
It is possible that his occasional inclusion on the list of the bishops of Whithorn is the result of a scribal mistake or confusion, and that there was no such bishop at that episcopal see.

At the end of John of Worcester's Chronicle are lists of bishops of the various dioceses, and the list for Candida Casa includes a certain Heathored as following Beadwulf, but no chronicle (including this one) mentions either Whithorn or its bishop after Beadwulf. However, the various chronicles continue to mention the deaths and consecrations of the bishops at York, Hexham, and Lindisfarne well into the ninth century. Had there been a successor to Beadwulf, it is unlikely that he would have escaped the attention of the chroniclers. Beadwulf is the last known Bishop of Candida Casa.

As to the possibility that there was confusion with another historical person named Heathored who might have been Bishop of Whithorn, there was a Bishop of Hexham named Heathored, who was consecrated in 797 on the death of Bishop Æthelberht of Hexham, and who served only until 800, when he died and was succeeded by Eanbert. However, Beadwulf was still the Bishop of Candida Casa in 803, so this Heathored could not be the one in question. It is not credible to suggest that the bishopric of Heathored of Lindisfarne would be extended to include far-off Candida Casa, across the territory of the still-active bishopric of Hexham. However, it is possible that the scribe who compiled the list at the end of John of Worcester's Chronicle was confused about whether one of these like-named bishops had served at Candida Casa.
