= Æthelwold (bishop of Lindisfarne) =

8th-century Bishop of Lindisfarne and saint

Æthelwold of Lindisfarne
- Bishop of Lindisfarne
- Appointed: 721
- Term ended: 740
- Predecessor: Eadfrith
- Successor: Cynewulf

Personal details
- Died: 740

Sainthood
- Feast day: February 12

Æthelwold of Lindisfarne (died 740) (also spelled Aethelwald, Ethelwold, etc.) was Bishop of Lindisfarne from 721 until 740.

Æthelwold contributed to the production of the Lindisfarne Gospels: he took the raw manuscripts that his predecessor Eadfrith had prepared and had Billfrith bind them so that they could be read easily. Æthelwold was one of the disciples and assistants of St. Cuthbert. He is the last Bishop of Lindisfarne to have been revered as a saint. He is often mistaken with his near contemporary, Æthelwold of Farne.

== Citations ==
Christian titles
Preceded by Eadfrith	Bishop of Lindisfarne; 721–740	Succeeded by Cynewulf
