= Higbald of Lindisfarne =

8th-century Bishop of Lindisfarne

- Bishop of Lindisfarne
- Appointed: 780 or 781
- Term ended: 25 May 803
- Predecessor: Cynewulf
- Successor: Egbert

Personal details
- Died: 25 May 803
- Denomination: Christian

Higbald of Lindisfarne (or Hygebald) was Bishop of Lindisfarne from 780 or 781 until his death on 25 May 803. Little is known about his life except that he was a regular communicator with Alcuin of York; it is in his letters to Alcuin that Higbald described in graphic detail the Viking raid on Lindisfarne on 8 June 793 in which many of his monks were killed.

Higbald has long been thought to be identical with the Speratus addressed in a letter by Alcuin of 797, but this is no longer viewed as likely.

== Citations ==
Christian titles
Preceded by Cynewulf	Bishop of Lindisfarne c. 780–803	Succeeded by Egbert
