= Aldred the Scribe =

10th century religious translator

Aldred the Scribe (also known as Aldred the Glossator) is the name by which scholars identify a tenth-century priest, otherwise known only as Aldred, who was a provost of the monastic community of St. Cuthbert at Chester-le-Street in 970.

He is best known for his gloss of the Lindisfarne Gospels in the late tenth century. His word for word translation of the Latin texts into the vernacular of Old English made the gospels more accessible to his Old English speaking community. The translation was not just a mechanical transcription, but translated difficult Latin concepts into a clearer Old English context. Aldred also added a colophon to the text that indicates many important details about this copy of the gospels. Scribes generally added colophons to indicate the circumstances of their work; sometimes including the place, date, price of the manuscript, and client for whom it was copied. Aldred's colophon indicates that the Gospels were written by Eadfrith, a bishop of Lindisfarne in 698, the original binding was supplied by Ethelwald, Eadfrith's successor in 721, and the outside ornamentation was done by Billfrith, an anchorite of Lindisfarne. He also states that the Gospels were created for God and St Cuthbert.

Apart from the Lindisfarne Gospels, Aldred also glossed the Durham Ritual, the two sets of glosses being the most substantial textual remnants of the tenth-century Northumbrian dialect of Old English.

In a note at the end of the manuscript Aldred calls himself the son of Alfred and Tilwin—‘Alfredi natus Aldredus vocor; bonæ mulieris (i.e. Tilwin) filius eximius loquor.’ It has been maintained that he wrote with his own hand only the glosses to St. John, and that the rest were penned by other scribes under his direction; but there is reason to believe that he wrote the whole of them himself.
