= Egbert of Lindisfarne =

9th-century Bishop of Lindisfarne

- Bishop of Lindisfarne
- Term ended: 821
- Predecessor: Higbald
- Successor: Heathwred

Orders
- Consecration: 11 June 803

Personal details
- Died: 821
- Denomination: Christian

Egbert of Lindisfarne (or Ecgberht) was Bishop of Lindisfarne from his consecration on 11 June 803 until his death in 821. He is often confused with Saint Egbert who served as a monk at Lindisfarne, though the latter never became a bishop there.

To Egbert of Lindisfarne was dedicated the Latin poem De abbatibus by a monk in one of the dependent houses of Lindisfarne.

== Citations ==
Christian titles
Preceded by Higbald	Bishop of Lindisfarne; 803–821	Succeeded by Heathwred
