= Billfrith =

8th-century Northumbrian saint

"the anchorite"
- Died: 8th-century
- Major shrine: Durham Cathedral
- Feast: 6 March
- Attributes: Goldsmith

Billfrith (Old English: Billfrið; fl. early 8th century) is an obscure Northumbrian saint credited with providing the jewel and metalwork encrusting the former treasure binding of the Lindisfarne Gospels. His name is thought to mean "peace of the two-edge sword".

== Biography ==
Symeon of Durham's Libellus de Exordio (ii.13), which calls him "St Billfrith the Anchorite", says he was a goldsmith and that he gilded an important book written by Eadfrith, Bishop of Lindisfarne. This book is the gospel book known today as the Lindisfarne Gospels. Symeon probably derived this information from a colophon added to the Lindisfarne Gospels by a scribe named "Aldred" at some point between 950 and 970. The colophons describes how:

Eadfrith, bishop of Lindisfarne church, originally wrote this book for God and for St Cuthbert and—jointly—for all saints whose relics are in the island. And Æthelwald, bishop of the Lindisfarne islanders, impressed it on the outside and covered it ... And Billfrið the anchorite forged the ornaments which are on it on the outside and adorned it with gold and gems and with gilded-on silver-pure metal ...

The Gospels today are in a different binding, as Billfrith's craftsmanship has not survived.

The name Billfrith occurs in the Durham Liber Vitae, and the latter is the only pre-Conquest source other than the Lindisfarne colophon containing Billfrith's name. Although this confraternity book did not begin until the 9th century, the name's position indicates that this Billfrith was from the 8th century. His name is in the same group as that of the Irish monk Echa, who died in 767.

The Libellus further relates that in the 11th century his venerated bones were among those taken from the monasteries and churches of Northumbria to Durham by Ælfred the Priest; Ælfred also took the bones of Balthere of Tyninghame, Acca and Alchmund of Hexham, King Oswine, and abbesses Æbbe and Æthelgitha. Billfrith's name appears in a relic list of the church of Durham dating to the mid-12th century. The Oxford Dictionary of Saints says that the "feast of Bilfrith and Baldred" was celebrated on 6 March.
