= Ælfsige (bishop of Lindisfarne) =

10th-century Bishop of Lindisfarne

- Bishop of St Cuthbert
- Appointed: perhaps around 968
- Term ended: perhaps around 990
- Predecessor: Aldred
- Successor: Aldhun

Personal details
- Died: perhaps around 990
- Denomination: Christian

Ælfsige (or Elfdig) was Bishop of Lindisfarne, perhaps appointed around 968. He perhaps died around 990.

== Citations ==
Christian titles
| Preceded by Aldred | Bishop of Lindisfarne ?968–990? | Succeeded by Aldhun |
