= Eadberht of Lindisfarne =

7th-century Bishop of Lindisfarne and saint

Eadberht
- Bishop of Lindisfarne
- Appointed: 688
- Term ended: 6 May 698
- Predecessor: Cuthbert
- Successor: Eadfrith

Personal details
- Died: 6 May 698
- Denomination: Roman Catholic Church; Eastern Orthodox Church

Sainthood
- Feast day: 6 May

Eadberht of Lindisfarne (died 6 May 698), also known as Saint Eadberht, was Bishop of Lindisfarne, England, from 688 until his death on 6 May 698.

== Life ==
After the death of Saint Cuthbert in 687, Wilfrid acted as administrator of the see of Lindisfarne. His brief tenure was confrontational. Eadberht was consecrated bishop of Lindisfarne in 688. He is credited with securing the buildings of St. Finan’s wooden church with lead, making them more durable. He is also notable as having founded the holy shrine of his predecessor Saint Cuthbert on the island of Lindisfarne, a place that was to become a centre of great pilgrimage in later years.

It is said that Eadberht favoured poverty and long periods of solitude and devotion as part of his service in the bishopric. (Note: Eadberht is known to have followed Cuthbert's example by using the small island of Hobthrush near Lindisfarne as a retreat. (Note: The Holy Island (Cartwright)..."This small island...was the site of Cuthbert's earliest retreats before he went to the Farnes...and Eadberht, also, was in the habit of isolating himself there in Lent...) (Note: Historic England..."The island was used by Cuthbert (c.AD 630-687) and his successor Eadberht as a retreat. It has been suggested that the Anglo-Saxon retreat might be comparable with that described by Bede on Farne, and comprise a cell and an oratory or chapel for private prayer...)) He was known for his great knowledge of scripture and for giving a tenth of everything to the poor. When he died he was buried in the same location from which Cuthbert's body had been exhumed earlier the same year. When the monks withdrew from the Island in 875 Eadberht's relics were eventually moved to Durham.

== Notes ==
Christian titles
Preceded by Cuthbert	Bishop of Lindisfarne; 688–698	Succeeded by Eadfrith
