= Ealdred of Lindisfarne =

10th-century Bishop of Lindisfarne

Ealdred
- Bishop of Lindisfarne
- Installed: unknown
- Term ended: perhaps around 968
- Predecessor: Sexhelm
- Successor: Elfdig

Personal details
- Died: perhaps around 968
- Denomination: Christian

Ealdred of Lindisfarne was Bishop of Lindisfarne, perhaps dying around 968.

== Citations ==
Christian titles
Preceded by Sexhelm	Bishop of Lindisfarne ??–968?	Succeeded by Elfdig
