= Cutheard of Lindisfarne =

10th-century Bishop of Lindisfarne

Cutheard
- Bishop of Lindisfarne
- Installed: 900
- Term ended: c. 915
- Predecessor: Eardulf
- Successor: Tilred

Personal details
- Died: c. 915
- Denomination: Christian

Cutheard of Lindisfarne (died c. 915) was Bishop of Lindisfarne from 899 to around 915, although the see was administered from Chester-le-Street.

Cutheard was responsible for purchasing the village of Bedlington in Northumberland, which was later incorporated into the properties belonging to the Bishopric of Durham when the sees were merged by Bishop Aldhun in 995. It was this purchase that was later responsible for the parish becoming the exclave of County Durham known as Bedlingtonshire.

== Citations ==
Christian titles
Preceded by Eardulf	Bishop of Lindisfarne; 900–915	Succeeded by Tilred
