= Uhtred of Lindisfarne =

10th-century Bishop of Lindisfarne

Uhtred
- Bishop of Lindisfarne
- Installed: maybe around 942
- Term ended: unknown
- Predecessor: Wilgred
- Successor: Sexhelm

Personal details
- Died: unknown
- Denomination: Christian

Uhtred of Lindisfarne was appointed as Bishop of Lindisfarne perhaps around 942. His death date is unknown.

== Citations ==
Christian titles
Preceded by Wilgred	Bishop of Lindisfarne; 942?–unknown	Succeeded by Sexhelm
