= Sexhelm of Lindisfarne =

10th-century Bishop of Lindisfarne

Sexhelm
- Bishop of Lindisfarne
- Installed: unknown
- Term ended: unknown
- Predecessor: Uchtred
- Successor: Aldred

Personal details
- Died: unknown
- Denomination: Christian

Sexhelm of Lindisfarne was Bishop of Lindisfarne for six months, but the year is unknown.

Sexhelm was probably the Sexhelm mentioned in Walter Scott's Marmion:

Was by the prelate Sexhelm made
A place of burial for such dead
As, having died in mortal sin,
Might not be laid the church within.

== Citations ==
Christian titles
Preceded by Uchtred	Bishop of Lindisfarne ??	Succeeded by Aldred
