= Tilred of Lindisfarne =

10th-century Bishop of Lindisfarne

Tilred
- Bishop of Lindisfarne
- Installed: c. 915
- Term ended: c. 925
- Predecessor: Cutheard
- Successor: Wilgred

Personal details
- Died: c. 925
- Denomination: Christian

Tilred of Lindisfarne (died c. 925) was Bishop of Lindisfarne between around 915 and until his death around 925.

Prior to moving to Lindisfarne Tilred had been the abbot of Heversham in Cumbria. It has been surmised that Tilred dedicated the monastery at Heversham to St Cuthbert (the patron saint of Lindisfarne) at some point after 901 so that he may later be accepted into the monastery there. If this was the case it obviously appears to have worked.

Tilred probably transferred across to Lindisfarne due to a fear of Scandinavian settlers, who were appearing in the Heversham area at that time.

== Citations ==
Christian titles
| Preceded by Cutheard | Bishop of Lindisfarne c. 915–c. 925 | Succeeded by Wilgred |
