= Cynewulf of Lindisfarne =

8th-century Bishop of Lindisfarne

- Bishop of Lindisfarne
- In office: 737 or 740
- Predecessor: Æthelwald
- Successor: Higbald

Personal details
- Died: 782 or 783
- Denomination: Christian

Cynewulf of Lindisfarne was appointed as Bishop of Lindisfarne in either 737 or 740. He resigned the see in 779 or 780 and died in 782 or 783.

In 750 Cynewulf was imprisoned by Eadberht of Northumbria for giving sanctuary to Prince Offa during a dynastic clash.

Some 19th-century scholars believed him to be Cynewulf, the poet only known through the runic signature appearing in several Old English poems. Besides the fact that the dialect used in these poems shows features of Northumbrian Old English, there is no solid proof for this theory.

== Citations ==
Christian titles
Preceded by Æthelwald	Bishop of Lindisfarne c. 740–c. 780	Succeeded by Higbald
