= Wigred =

English bishop

Wilgred
- Bishop of Lindisfarne
- Installed: c. 925
- Term ended: maybe 942
- Predecessor: Tilred
- Successor: Uchtred

Personal details
- Died: c. 942
- Denomination: Christian

Wigred (or Wilgred) (died c. 942) was appointed Bishop of Chester-le-Street around 925. He was also known as the Bishop of the Church of St Cuthbert. He attested charters of King Æthelstan between 928 and 934, and the bishopric in his time was probably the greatest landholder between the Tees and the Tyne.

== Citations ==
Christian titles
Preceded by Tilred	Bishop of Chester-le-Street c. 925–942?	Succeeded by Uchtred
