= Ecgred of Lindisfarne =

9th-century Bishop of Lindisfarne

- Bishop of Lindisfarne
- Appointed: 830
- Term ended: 845
- Predecessor: Heathwred
- Successor: Eanbert

Personal details
- Died: 845
- Denomination: Christian

Ecgred of Lindisfarne (or Egfrid) was Bishop of Lindisfarne from 830 until his death in 845.

== Citations ==
Christian titles
Preceded by Heathwred	Bishop of Lindisfarne; 830–845	Succeeded by Eanbert
