= Æthelwold (hermit) =

7th-century English Christian monk

Saint Æthelwold

Hieromonk
- Died: 23 March 699; Farne Island, Northumbria
- Resting place: Durham Cathedral
- Honored in: Anglican Communion, Orthodox Church, Catholic Church
- Canonized: Pre-Congregation

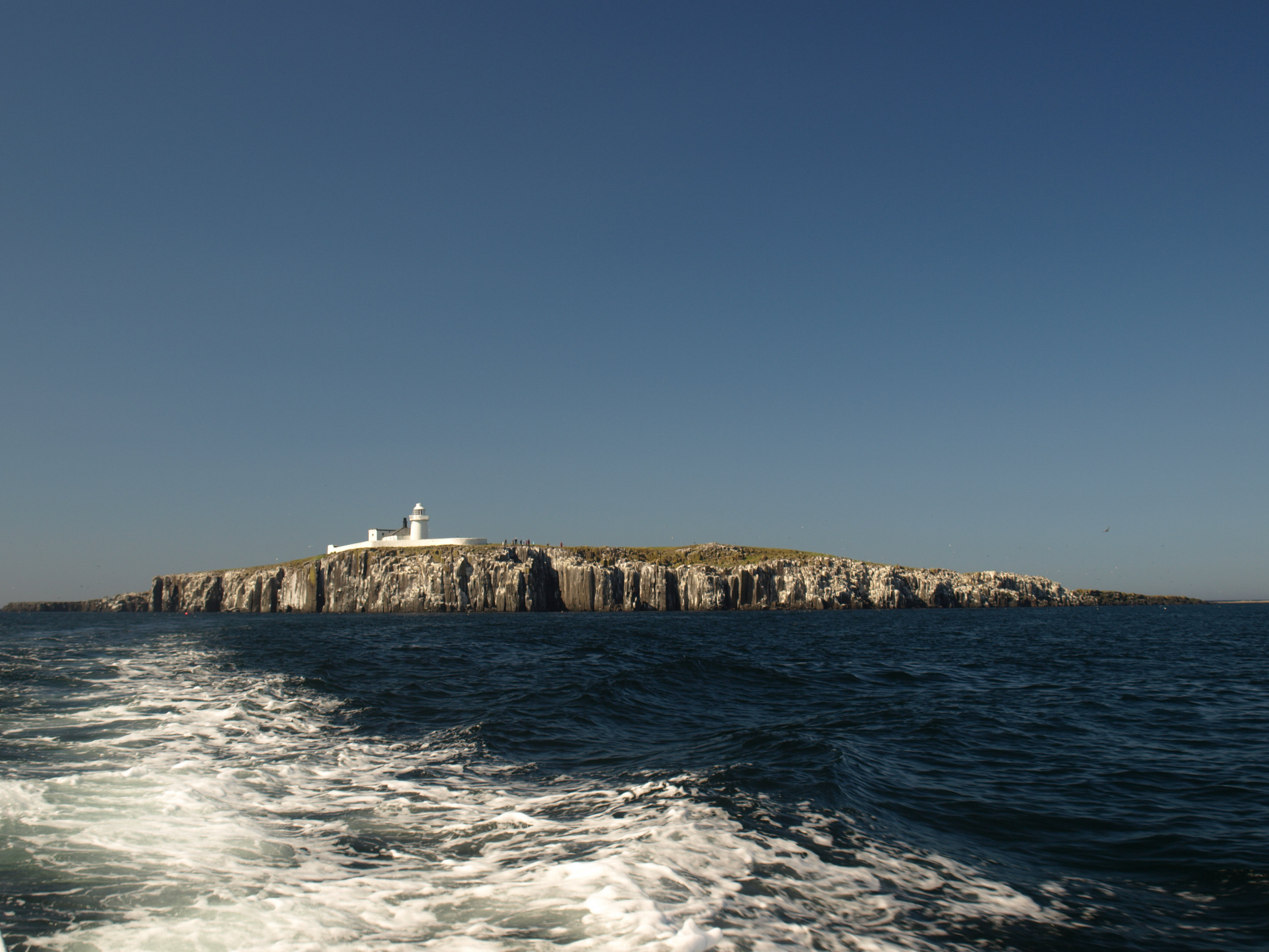
Inner Farne Island

Saint Æthelwold of Farne (also spelled Aethelwald, Ethilwold, etc.) was a late 7th-century hermit who lived on Inner Farne, off the coast of the English county of Northumberland.

Little is known about him, apart from what is recorded in the writings of the Venerable Bede. Æthelwold was both a priest and a monk from Ripon Abbey. Being desirous of some solitude, he succeeded to the tiny hermitage of Saint Cuthbert on Farne, after the latter's death in 687. He, however, found it so drafty that he was obliged to make much needed repairs using a calfskin. The best-known story about Æthelwold, relates how the future Abbot Guthrid visited him on his island with two Lindisfarne monks and, on his journey home, was saved from shipwreck by the saint's prayers.

Æthelwold died on 23 March 699 (not 720 as is sometimes stated). He was buried with Cuthbert and, like him, was eventually enshrined in Durham Cathedral.

He was succeeded by Felgild.

His feast day is 23 March.

He should not be confused with his near contemporary, Saint Æthelwold of Lindisfarne.
