= Heathwred of Lindisfarne =

9th-century Bishop of Lindisfarne

Heathored of Lindisfarne
- Bishop of Lindisfarne
- Appointed: 821
- Term ended: 830
- Predecessor: Egbert of Lindisfarne
- Successor: Ecgred

Personal details
- Died: 830
- Denomination: Christian

Heathwred of Lindisfarne (also cited as Heathored) was Bishop of Lindisfarne from 821 until his death in 830.

== Citations ==
Christian titles
Preceded by Egbert	Bishop of Lindisfarne; 821–830	Succeeded by Ecgred
