= Eadfrith of Lindisfarne =

7th and 8th-century Bishop of Lindisfarne and saint

Saint Edfrith
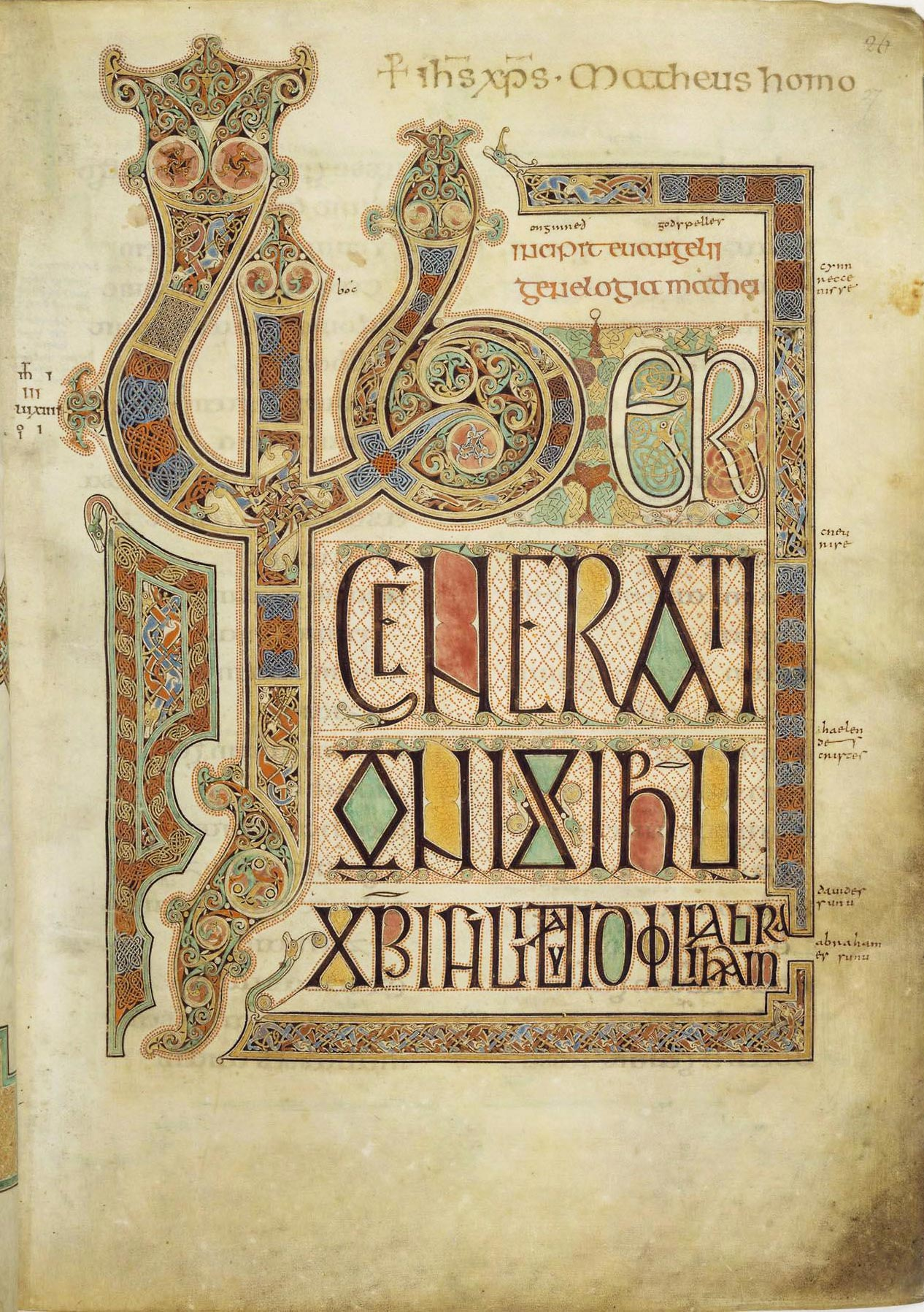
- Incipit of the Gospel of Matthew from the Lindisfarne Gospels, an illuminated manuscript said to have been created by Eadfrith

Bishop of Lindisfarne
- Born: 654
- Died: 721 or 722
- Venerated in: Eastern Orthodox Church; Anglican Communion; Roman Catholic Church
- Feast: June 4

Eadfrith of Lindisfarne (died 721), also known as Saint Eadfrith, was Bishop of Lindisfarne, probably from 698 onwards. By the twelfth century it was believed that Eadfrith succeeded Eadberht and nothing in the surviving records contradicts this belief. Lindisfarne was among the main religious sites of the kingdom of Northumbria in the early eighth century, the resting place of Saints Aidan and Cuthbert. He is venerated as a Saint in the Roman Catholic Church, and in the Eastern Orthodox Church, as also in the Anglican Communion.

== Life ==
A colophon added to the Lindisfarne Gospels in the tenth century states that Eadfrith was the scribe and artist responsible for the work. The Lindisfarne Gospels were the product of a single scribe and illustrator, working full-time over a period of about two years. For this reason, many historians who accept that the work was authored by Eadfrith in person date it to the period before he became bishop. Not all historians accept that he was the scribe: some argue that he may have commissioned the work rather than creating it in person; some reject the association as an unreliable tradition. Michelle Brown, "Lindisfarne Gospels" argues for Eadfrith being the artist and scribe, working on it as eremitic devotional act in the Columban tradition from 715-722 (dated on textual grounds of the liturgies marked by initials therein and historical context), and the main architect of the cult of St Cuthbert.

Contemporary witnesses to Eadberht's episcopacy portray him as a supporter of the cult of Saint Cuthbert. He commissioned three lives of the Saint, the first by an anonymous writer, written between 699 and 705. This Anonymous Life of Saint Cuthbert was revised on Eadfrith's orders by Bede, writing around 720, to produce both prose and verse lives.

Eadfrith also oversaw the restoration of the hermitage on Farne where Cuthbert had often lived. He is named in Æthelwulf's ninth century poem De abbatibus as having advised Eanmund, first abbot of a monastery—its name and location are unknown—founded during the reign of King Osred.

When Lindisfarne was abandoned in the late ninth century, Eadfrith's remains were among those taken on the community's long wanderings through Northumbria. The relics of Saint Cuthbert, and those of Eadfrith along with them, eventually found a new home at Chester-le-Street, where they remained for a century. In 995 the relics were translated to Durham Cathedral. At Durham Eadfrith, along with his predecessor Eadberht and successor Æthelwold, was commemorated on 4 June.

== Citations ==
Christian titles
Preceded by Eadberht	Bishop of Lindisfarne; 698–721	Succeeded by Æthelwald
