= Bishop of Durham =

Diocesan bishop in the Church of England

- Bishopric

Anglican
- Arms of the Diocese of Durham: Azure, a cross Or between four lions rampant Argent
- Incumbent; Rick Simpson

Location
- Ecclesiastical province: York

Information
- First holder: Aidan; Aldhun (first bishop of Durham)
- Established: 635 (at Lindisfarne); 995 (translation to Durham)
- Diocese: Durham
- Cathedral: Durham Cathedral (since 995); St Mary and St Cuthbert, Chester-le-Street (882–995); Lindisfarne (635–875)

The bishop of Durham is head of the diocese of Durham in the province of York. The diocese is one of the oldest in England and its bishop is invariably a member of the House of Lords. The current bishop, in office since 29 April 2026, is the Right Reverend Richard Simpson (formerly Archdeacon of Auckland).

The bishop is officially styled The Right Reverend (First Name), by Divine Providence Lord Bishop of Durham, but this full title is rarely used. In signatures, the bishop's family name is replaced by Dunelm, from the Latin name for Durham (the Latinised form of Old English Dunholm). In the past, bishops of Durham varied their signatures between Dunelm and the French Duresm. Prior to 1836 the bishop had significant temporal powers over the liberty of Durham and later the county palatine of Durham. The bishop, with the bishop of Bath and Wells, escorts the sovereign at the coronation.

Durham Castle was a residence of the bishops from its construction in the 11th century until 1832, when it was given to the University of Durham to use as a college. Auckland Castle then became the bishops' main residence until July 2012, when it was sold to the Auckland Castle Trust. The bishop continues to have offices there.

== History ==
The Bishop of Lindisfarne is an episcopal title which takes its name after the tidal island of Lindisfarne, which lies just off the northeast coast of Northumberland, England. The title was first used by the Anglo-Saxons between the 7th and 10th centuries. In the reign of Æthelstan (924–939) Wigred, thought by Simon Keynes to have been Bishop of Chester-le-Street, attested royal charters. According to George Molyneaux, the church of St Cuthbert "was in all probability the greatest landholder between the Tees and the Tyne". Traditionally, following the chronology of the twelfth-century writer Symeon of Durham, historians have believed that the body of St Cuthbert and centre of the diocese lay at Chester-le-Street from the ninth century until 995, but recent research has suggested that the bishops may have been based at Norham on the River Tweed until after 1013. The title of "bishop of Lindisfarne" is now used by the Catholic Church for a titular see (there is also a Catholic titular see of Cuncacestre, the Latin form of Chester-le-Street).

The Anglo-Saxon dioceses before 925

The Anglo-Saxon bishops of Lindisfarne were ordinaries of several early medieval episcopal sees (and dioceses) in Northumbria and pre-Conquest England. The first such see was founded at Lindisfarne in 635 by Saint Aidan.

From the 7th century onwards, in addition to their spiritual authority, the bishops of Lindisfarne, and then Durham, also acted as the civil ruler of the region as the lord of the liberty of Durham, with local authority equal to that of the king. The bishop appointed all local officials and maintained his own court. After the Norman Conquest, this power was retained by the bishop and was eventually recognised with the designation of the region as the County Palatine of Durham. As holder of this office, the bishop was both the earl of the county and bishop of the diocese. Though the term 'prince-bishop' has become a common way of describing the role of the bishop prior to 1836, the term was unknown in medieval England.

A UNESCO site describes the role of the bishops as a "buffer state between England and Scotland":

From 1075, the bishop of Durham became a prince-bishop, with the right to raise an army, mint his own coins, and levy taxes. As long as he remained loyal to the king of England, he could govern as a virtually autonomous ruler, reaping the revenue from his territory, but also remaining mindful of his role of protecting England's northern frontier.

A 1788 report adds that the bishops had the authority to appoint judges and barons and to offer pardons.

Except for a brief period of suppression during the English Civil War, the bishopric retained this temporal power until it was abolished by the Durham (County Palatine) Act 1836 (6 & 7 Will. 4. c. 19) with the powers returned to the Crown. A shadow of the former temporal power can be seen in the bishop's coat of arms, which contains a coronet as well as a mitre and crossed crozier and sword. The bishop of Durham also continued to hold a seat in the House of Lords; that has continued to this day by virtue of the ecclesiastical office.

== List of bishops ==
=== Early medieval bishops ===
Bishops of Lindisfarne
From	Until	Incumbent	Notes
635	651	Aidan	Saint Aidan.
651	661	Finan	Saint Finan.
661	664	Colmán	Saint Colmán.
664		Tuda	Saint Tuda.
In 664 the diocese was merged to York by Wilfrid (who succeeded Tuda following his death), leaving one large diocese in the large northern Kingdom of Northumbria.
The diocese was reinstated in 678 by Theodore of Tarsus, Archbishop of Canterbury following Wilfrid's banishment from Northumbria by King Ecgfrith. Its new seat was initially (at least in part) at Hexham (until a new diocese was created there in 680).
678	685	Eata of Hexham	Saint Eata.
685	687	Cuthbert	Saint Cuthbert.
688	698	Eadberht	Saint Eadberht.
698	721	Eadfrith	Saint Eadfrith.
721	740	Æthelwold	Saint Æthelwold.
740	780	Cynewulf	
780	803	Higbald	Viking raid 793
803	821	Egbert	
821	830	Heathwred	
830	845	Ecgred	
845	854	Eanbert	
854	875	Eardulf	
883	889	Eardulf	
900	c. 915	Cutheard	
c. 915	c. 925	Tilred	
c. 925	maybe 942?	Wilgred	
maybe 942?	unknown	Uchtred	
unknown, expelled after 6 months		Sexhelm	
before 946	maybe 968?	Aldred	
maybe 968?	maybe 968?	Ælfsige	Called "Bishop of St Cuthbert".
990	995	Aldhun	According to the traditional account, the see was moved to Durham.
In 995, the King had paid the Danegeld to the Danish and Norwegian Kings and peace was restored. According to the legend, Aldhun was on his way to reestablish the see at Lindisfarne when he received a divine vision that the body of St Cuthbert should be laid to rest in Durham.
Bishops of Durham
From	Until	Incumbent	Notes
995	1018	Aldhun	
1021	1041	Edmund	
1041	1042	Eadred	
1042	1056	Æthelric	
1056	1071	Æthelwine	

=== Post Norman conquest bishops ===
Bishops of Durham
From	Until	Incumbent	Notes
1071	1080	Walcher	
1081	1096	William de St-Calais	
1099	1128	Ranulf Flambard	
1133	1140	Geoffrey Rufus	
1141	1143	William Cumin	
1143	1153	William of St. Barbara	
1153	1195	Hugh de Puiset	
1197	1208	Philip of Poitou	
1209	1213	Richard Poore	Election quashed by Pope Innocent III (who was quarrelling with King John); later elected and consecrated.
1214	1214	John de Gray	Died before consecration.
1215	1215	Morgan	Election quashed.
1217	1226	Richard Marsh	
1226	1227	William Scot	Election quashed.
1229	1237	Richard Poore	Translated from Salisbury.
1237	1240	Thomas de Melsonby	Resigned before consecration.
1241	1249	Nicholas Farnham	
1249	1260	Walter of Kirkham	
1260	1274	Robert Stitchill	
1274	1283	Robert of Holy Island	
1284	1310	Antony Bek	Also Titular Patriarch of Jerusalem from 1306 to 1311 (the only English person ever to hold this post).
1311	1316	Richard Kellaw	In the ensuing vacancy, Thomas de Charlton, John Walwayn and John de Kynardesley were nominated by Edward II, Humphrey de Bohun, 4th Earl of Hereford and Thomas, 2nd Earl of Lancaster respectively, but the chapter elected Henry de Stamford OSB on 6 November 1316. That election was never confirmed, but quashed by Pope John XXII on 10 December.
1317	1333	Lewis de Beaumont	
1333	1345	Richard de Bury	
1345	1381	Thomas Hatfield	
1382	1388	John Fordham	Translated to Ely.
1388	1406	Walter Skirlaw	Translated from Bath & Wells.
1406	1437	Thomas Langley	
1437	1457	Robert Neville	Translated from Salisbury
1457	1476	Lawrence Booth	Translated to York.
1476	1483	William Dudley	
1484	1494	John Sherwood	
1494	1501	Richard Foxe	Translated from Bath & Wells, later translated to Winchester.
1502	1505	William Senhouse	Translated from Carlisle.
1507	1508	Christopher Bainbridge	Translated to York.
1509	1523	Thomas Ruthall	
1523	1529	Thomas Wolsey	Archbishop of York. Held Durham in commendam.
1530	1552	Cuthbert Tunstall	Translated from London.

=== Post-Reformation bishops ===
Bishops of Durham
From	Until	Incumbent	Notes
1530	1552	Cuthbert Tunstall	
1552	1554	The diocese was abolished under Edward VI and restored after Mary I became queen.	
1554	1559	Cuthbert Tunstall	Deprived in 1559, when he refused to take the Oath of Supremacy after the accession of Elizabeth I. Died on 18 November that year.
1561	1576	James Pilkington	
1577	1587	Richard Barnes	Translated from Carlisle.
1589	1595	Matthew Hutton	Translated to York.
1595	1606	Tobias Matthew	Translated to York.
1606	1617	William James	
1617	1627	Richard Neile	Translated from Lincoln, later translated to Winchester.
1627	1628	George Montaigne	Translated from London, later translated to York.
1628	1632	John Howson	Translated from Oxford
1632	1646	Thomas Morton	Translated from Lichfield; deprived of the see when the English episcopacy was abolished by Parliament on 9 October 1646; died 1659.
1646	1660	The diocese was abolished during the Commonwealth and the Protectorate.	
1660	1672	John Cosin	
1674	1721	Nathaniel Crew	Translated from Oxford.
1721	1730	William Talbot	Translated from Salisbury.
1730	1750	Edward Chandler	Translated from Lichfield.
1750	1752	Joseph Butler	Translated from Bristol.
1752	1771	Richard Trevor	Translated from St David's.
1771	1787	John Egerton	Translated from Lichfield.
1787	1791	Thomas Thurlow	Translated from Lincoln.
1791	1826	Shute Barrington	Translated from Salisbury.
1826	1836	William Van Mildert	Translated from Llandaff.

=== Late modern bishops (since 1836) ===
Bishops of Durham
From	Until	Incumbent	Notes
1836	1856	Edward Maltby	Translated from Chichester.
1856	1860	Charles Longley	Translated from Ripon, later translated to York, then to Canterbury.
1860	1861	Henry Montagu Villiers	Translated from Carlisle.
1861	1879	Charles Baring	Translated from Gloucester and Bristol.
1879	1889	J. B. Lightfoot	Previously Lady Margaret's Professor of Divinity at Cambridge.
1890	1901	Brooke Foss Westcott	Previously Regius Professor of Divinity at Cambridge.
1901	1920	Handley Moule	Previously Norrisian Professor of Divinity at Cambridge.
1920	1939	Hensley Henson	Translated from Hereford.
1939	1952	Alwyn Williams	Translated to Winchester.
1952	1956	Michael Ramsey	Translated to York, then to Canterbury.
1956	1966	Maurice Harland	Translated from Lincoln.
1966	1972	Ian Ramsey	Previously Nolloth Professor of the Philosophy of the Christian Religion at Oxford.
1973	1983	John Habgood	Translated to York.
1984	1994	David Jenkins	Previously Professor of Theology University of Leeds
1994	2003	Michael Turnbull	Translated from Rochester
2003	2010	N. T. Wright	Previously Dean of Lichfield; returned to academia.
2011	2013	Justin Welby	Translated to Canterbury.
2014	2024	Paul Butler	Previously Bishop of Southwell and Nottingham; confirmed 20 January 2014; retired 29 February 2024.
2026		Richard Simpson	Previously Archdeacon of Auckland

== Assistant bishops ==
Among those who have served as assistant bishops of the diocese have been:

- 1889–1902 (ret.): Daniel Sandford, Rector of Boldon and coadjutor bishop; former Bishop of Tasmania
- 1904–1906: Noel Hodges, former Bishop of Travancore and Cochin (later Assistant Bishop of Ely and of St Albans)
- 1970–1975: Kenneth Skelton, Rector of Bishopwearmouth and former Bishop of Matabeleland (became Bishop of Lichfield)

== Sources ==
- Fryde, E. B.; Greenway, D. E.; Porter, S.; Roy, I., eds. (2003) [1986]. Handbook of British Chronology (3rd ed.). Cambridge: Cambridge University Press. ISBN 0-521-56350-X.
- Keynes, Simon. "Table XXXVII: Attestations of ecclesiastics during the reign of King Æthelstan" (PDF). Kemble: The Anglo-Saxon Charters Website. Archived from the original (PDF) on 21 July 2015.
- Molyneaux, George (2015). The Formation of the English Kingdom in the Tenth Century. Oxford University Press. ISBN 978-0-19-871791-1.
- Fryde, E. B.; Greenway, D. E.; Porter, S.; Roy, I., eds. (1986). Handbook of British Chronology (3rd, reprinted 2003 ed.). Cambridge: Cambridge University Press. pp. 216, 241–243. ISBN 0-521-56350-X.
- Greenway, D. E. (1971). "Bishops of Durham". Fasti Ecclesiae Anglicanae 1066–1300: Volume 2: Monastic Cathedrals (Northern and Southern Provinces). British History Online. pp. 29–32.
- Jones, B. (1963). "Bishops of Durham". Fasti Ecclesiae Anglicanae 1300–1541: Volume 6: Northern Province (York, Carlise and Durham). British History Online. pp. 107–109.
- Horn, J. M.; Smith, D. M.; Mussett, P. (2004). "Bishops of Durham". Fasti Ecclesiae Anglicanae 1541–1857: Volume 11: Carlisle, Chester, Durham, Manchester, Ripon, and Sodor and Man Dioceses. British History Online. pp. 73–77.
- McGuigan, Neil (2022), "Cuthbert's Body and the Origins of the Diocese of Durham", Anglo-Saxon England, 48: 121–162, doi:10.1017/S0263675121000053, ISSN 0263-6751, S2CID 252995619
- Woolf, Alex (2018), "The Diocese of Lindisfarne: Organization and Pastoral Care", in McGuigan, Neil; Woolf, Alex (eds.), The Battle of Carham: A Thousand Years On, Edinburgh: John Donald, pp. 231–39, ISBN 978-1910900246
