= Hexham Abbey =

Coordinates: 54.972°N 2.103°W

- Church of the Augustinian Priory of St Andrew, Hexham
- Hexham Abbey seen from East
- Hexham Abbey
- OS grid reference: NY 93536 64107
- Location: Hexham, Northumberland
- Address: The Priory Church of St Andrews', Market Place
- Country: England
- Denomination: Church of England
- Previous denomination: Roman Catholic
- Churchmanship: Liberal catholic
- Website: www.hexhamabbey.org.uk

History
- Status: Active
- Founded: c.674 AD
- Dedication: Andrew the Apostle

Architecture
- Functional status: Parish church
- Heritage designation: Grade I Listed Building, Scheduled Monument
- Style: Early English Gothic
- Years built: c.1170–1250

Administration
- Province: York
- Diocese: Newcastle
- Parish: Hexham

Clergy
- Rector: The Rev'd Canon David Glover, KHC
- Priest: Rev'd Ryan McKeon

Scheduled monument
- Official name: Remains of Medieval Priory and Anglo-Saxon Monastery Under and Around Hexham Abbey and Its Precincts
- Reference no.: 1006593

Listed Building – Grade I
- Official name: The Priory Church of St Andrews'
- Type: Grade I
- Designated: 2 October 1951
- Reference no.: 1042576

Hexham Abbey is a Grade I listed church dedicated to St Andrew, in the town of Hexham, Northumberland. Founded in AD 674, the abbey was rebuilt in the 12th century, with additions in the early 20th century. Since the dissolution of the monasteries in 1537, the Abbey has been the parish church of Hexham. In 2014 the Abbey reacquired its former monastic buildings, which had been used as Hexham magistrates' court, and subsequently developed them into a permanent exhibition and visitor centre.

== History ==
The 7th century crypt

=== Saxon cathedral ===
In 671/672, Saint Wilfrid was given land for a church at Hexham by Northumbrian queen Æthelthryth. Of Wilfrid's church, constructed c.675-680 almost entirely of material salvaged from nearby Roman ruins, the crypt still remains, as does a 7th/8th century frith stool (a cathedra or throne). For a little while around that time it was the seat of a bishopric.

The first diocese of Lindisfarne was merged into the Diocese of York in 664. York diocese was then divided in 678 by Theodore of Tarsus, forming a bishopric for the country between the Rivers Aln and Tees, with a seat at Hexham and/or Lindisfarne. This gradually and erratically merged back into the bishopric of Lindisfarne. Eleven bishops of Hexham followed St. Eata, of which six were saints. Fragments of the memorial cross of one of them, Acca, have been re-erected in the south transept.

No successor was appointed in 821, the condition of the country being too unsettled. In the year 876 Halfdan Ragnarsson and his Danes ravaged the whole of Tyneside. Hexham was sacked and the church was plundered and burnt to the ground. The bishopric was merged with Lindisfarne, which latter see was removed to Chester-le-Street in 883, and thence to Durham in 995.

About 1050, one Eilaf was put in charge of Hexham, although as treasurer of Durham, he probably never went there. Eilaf was instructed to rebuild Hexham Church, which then lay in ruins. His son Eilaf II completed the work, probably building in the Norman style.

15th century panel paintings.

=== Medieval priory ===
In 1113, Wilfrid's abbey was replaced by an Augustinian priory established by Thomas II, Archbishop of York. The current church largely dates from c.1170–1250, built in the Early English Gothic style. The choir and transepts date from this period. The reconstruction was interrupted by the Wars of Scottish Independence, with the priory being burnt in 1296, and the nave was left incomplete throughout the Middle Ages. The Scots returned in 1312/13, 1315 and 1318. In response, the priory built a fortified moot hall and gaol in the town, both of which still stand - the latter is now called Hexham Old Gaol). Despite armed resistance by the canons, the priory was dissolved in 1536-37, and its church became a parish church. In 1538, the rest of the priory site and the church advowson were granted to Sir Reginald Carnaby, who had administered it for the Crown.

Compared to many monastic churches, the medieval furnishings survived the Dissolution well, with the night stairs, pulpitum, misericords, lectern and chantry chapels extant, some with medieval paintings. These include the bishops of Hexham and Lindisfarne (pulpitum west face and reredos), the Annunciation and Visitation (pulpitum passage), Christ and the Apostles, and the Danse Macabre (both on a screen near the Leschman Chantry). The chantry chapels commemorate priors Ogle (d.1410) and Leschman (d.1491 or 1499). The monastic buildings have fared less well, with only the chapter house vestibule, the much-rebuilt west range, the battered but elegant lavatorium and the Norman gatehouse surviving.

The 20th century nave

=== Parish church ===
The east end was rebuilt in 1858 to designs by John Dobson, in an Early English style that was seen as more in keeping with the rest of the church, at the cost of destroying the genuine late medieval east end. The Abbey was restored during the incumbency of Canon Edwin Sidney Savage, who came to Hexham in 1898 and remained until 1919. This project involved the restoration of the choir and the completion of the nave to designs by Temple Moore, incorporating the abortive 15th century work. The nave was re-consecrated on 8 August 1908. The Hexham Abbey high-altar cross, a fine work by the Keswick School of Industrial Art, was donated to the church in 1902.

The church was Grade I listed in 1951. In 1996 an additional chapel of St Wilfred was created at the east end of the north choir aisle, which offers a place for prayer or quiet reflection.

== Crypt ==
The crypt is a plain structure of four chambers. Here were exhibited the relics which were a feature of Wilfrid's church. It consists of a chapel with an ante-chapel at the west end, two side passages with enlarged vestibules and three stairways. The chapel and ante-chapel are barrel-vaulted. All the stones used are of Roman workmanship and many are carved or with inscriptions. One inscription on a slab, partially erased, reads:

IMP •CAES •L •SEP • • •
PERTINAX •ET •IMPC • •
AVR •ANTONINV • • • •
VS • • • • • • • • •
• • • •HORTE • • •
VEXILLATION • • • • •
FECERVNT SVB • • • • •

Translated, this means The Emperor Lucius Septimus Severus Pius Pertinax and his sons the Emperor Marcus Aurelius Antoninus Pius Augustus and Publius Geta Caesar the cohorts and detachments made this under the command of ….. The words erased are of great interest: after the Emperor Geta was murdered by his brother Caracalla, an edict was made at Rome ordering that whenever the two names appeared in combination that of Geta was to be erased. This so-called damnatio memoriae was carried out, but so poorly that the name can still be read.

== Tombstone of Flavinus ==
Tombstone of Flavinus, a Roman standard-bearer

The tombstone of Flavinus is one of the most significant Roman finds in Britain.Flavinus was a Roman cavalry officer who died aged 25 in the first century. The slab is thought to have once stood near the fort of Coria near Corbridge and was brought here as a building stone in the 12th century. The slab was laid face-upward in the foundations of the cloister and was rediscovered in 1881. It is now at the foot of the Night Stair.

== Stained glass ==
Four of the stained glass windows in the Abbey are the work of Jersey-born Henry Thomas Bosdet. The east window was the first and was installed about 1907. Two smaller windows followed and the large west window was installed in 1918.

== Hexham Hoard ==
In 1833 a hoard of approximately 8000 stycas were discovered whilst a grave was being dug in the Campey Hill area close to the north transept. The Hexham Hoard was concealed circa 850. It was composed of coins from the reigns of Eanred, Aethelred II and Redwulf, as well as coins of two archbishops Eanbald and Wigmund.

== Choirs ==
The Choir looking east

Hexham Abbey Boys' Choir consists of boys' and men's voices and sings choral evensong on Wednesdays during term time in addition to alternating morning and evening services on Sundays with the Girls Choir. The choir has made two CDs in recent years and has toured to Paris (2007), Rome (2009), Hanover (2011), Berlin (2012), Antwerp (2014) and Tallinn (2015) in addition to several tours within Great Britain. Several past members of the choir have gone on to win choral/organ scholarships at Oxford and Cambridge colleges. The choir has appeared on BBC Songs of Praise.

Hexham Abbey Girls' Choir consists of girls and men and sings choral evensong on Thursdays in term time in addition to alternating morning and evening services on Sundays with the Boys Choir. The choir began in September 2001 and is divided into junior & senior choristers aging from 7–18. The choir has toured to Dublin (2007), Paris (2009), Hanover (2011), Berlin (2012) and several other places.

== Organ ==
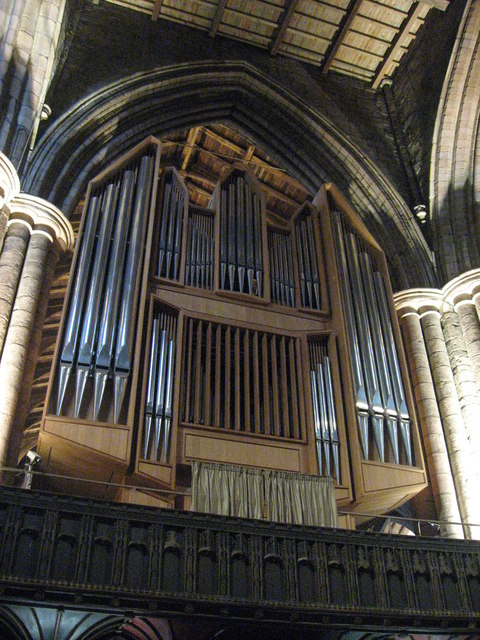
The organ of 1974

In 1865 the Abbey acquired a second-hand organ from Carlisle Cathedral dating from 1804. It was installed in Hexham by Nicholson of Newcastle and opened on 19 October 1865. In 1905 this was rebuilt by Norman and Beard with Sir Frederick Bridge of Westminster Abbey as the consultant.

In 1974 a new instrument by Lawrence Phelps of Pennsylvania was installed. It is a two manual 34-stop mechanical action instrument.

=== Organists ===
- George Agnew Reay 1820–????
- William Turner 1826–1865 1834–1855–1865
- John Nicholson 1865–1878
- James Price 1878–1882 (afterwards organist of St Margaret's Church, Ipswich)
- Thomas Simpson Camidge 1882–1889
- Richard Seaton 1889–1909
- Ronald Richardson Potter 1909–1911
- Newell Smith Wallbank 1911–1917 (later organist of Wakefield Cathedral)
- Harry William Tupper 1917–1918 (afterwards Organist of Southwell Minster)
- Hubert Henry Norsworthy 1918
- Newell Smith Wallbank 1918–1926 (later organist of Wakefield Cathedral)
- Cecil S. Richards 1926
- Reginald Tustin Baker 1928–1929 (later organist of Sheffield Cathedral)
- Thomas Christy 1933–1945 (formerly sub-organist of Newcastle Cathedral 1928–1933)
- Alfred Southcott Morrish 1945–1948
- Frederick Hudson 1948–1949
- Dr Reginald Cooper
- Ronald Womersley
- Terence Atkinson 1965–1985
- John Green 1985–2000 (also Director of Music at Dame Allan's School, Newcastle, 1967–1990)
- Michael Haynes 2000–2011
- Marcus Wibberley 2011–2017
- Michael Haynes 2017–2026
- Matthew Kelley 2026-

=== Assistant organists ===
- Colin Basil Fanshaw 1947–1949
- Dorothy Alder
- John Green 1961–1968
- Ron Lane 1969–1977
- John Green 1977–1983
- Henry Wallace 1983–1999
- Hugh Morris 2001–2009 (currently director of the Royal School of Church Music)
- Alexander Woodrow 2009–2012 (later director of music at Bradford Cathedral and currently Organist and Director of Music at Leeds Minster
- Andrew Wyatt 2012–2015 (currently assistant organist at Truro Cathedral)
- Michael Haynes 2015–2017 (formerly director of music 2000–2011 and 2017-2026)
- Keith Dale 2017–2025
- Matthew Kelley 2025–2026 (As Assistant Director of Music, became Director of Music in 2026)
- Andrew Adair 2026-

== List of Bishops of Hexham ==
- Eata, 'bishop of Bernicia', with his seat at Hexham and/or Lindisfarne, died 685, succeeded by John of Beverley (Bede, Ecclesiastical History IV.12)
- Trumbert, 682, as 'bishop of Hexham', at the same time as Trumwine's installation, with Eata continuing as bishop at Lindisfarne
- Cuthbert of Lindisfarne, 685, after Trumbert's deposition, moving his seat to Lindisfarne to become bishop of Lindisfarne (Bede, IV.28)
- St. John of Beverley (685–705) (Bede, V.2). From then on, the seat was at Hexham, and the bishopric of Lindisfarne continued independently, with Eadberht succeeding Cuthbert
- St. Wilfrid, who, resigning the See of York, died as Bishop of Hexham in 709
- St. Acca, Wilfrid's successor, from 709 (Bede, V.20)
- Frithubeorht 734–766
- St. Eahlmund 767–781
- Tilbeorht 781–789
- Æthelberht 789–797 transferred from Whithorn
- Heardred 797–800
- Eanbehrt 800–813
- Tidfrith, last bishop in this line, who died about 821

== List of Priors ==
- Aschetill or Asketill, 1114-1129/30
- Robert Biseth, 1130-1141, resigned and joined the Cistercians
- Richard, 1141-c.1167 (date of death has been given as late as 1178)
- John, c.1167-c1209
- William, c.1209-?
- Bernard, recorded 1236 and 1242
- John de Lazeby, recorded 1251 and 1271
- Richard de Ebor, elected 1271 but appointment refused by the Archbishop of York
- Henry de Merdene, 1271-1281
- William del Clay, 1281-1292
- Thomas de Fenwick, 1293-1311, resigned
- Gilbert de Boroughbridge, 1311-1312, nominated by the Archbishop of York but rejected by the canons
- Robert de Whelpington, 1312-1328, resigned
- Thomas de Appleton, 1328-c.1345
- John de Bridekirk, 1345-c.1349
- John de Walworth, 1349-c.1358
- William de Kendal, 1358-1366
- Alexander de Marton, 1367-1398, resigned
- John de Hexham, 1399-1409
- William de Woodhorne, 1409-c.1428
- John de Brawby, 1428-1443
- Thomas Ferrer (or Ferrour), 1443-1457, resigned
- John Wells, 1457-1475
- William Bywell, 1476-1479/80
- Rowland Leschman, 1480-1499
- Thomas Smithson, 1499-1524
- Edward Jay, 1524-1536, deposed at the Dissolution

== List of Rectors ==
Hexham Abbey high-altar cross

- Canon Barker 1866–18[98?]
- Edwin Sidney Savage 1898–1918
- James Vaux Cornell Farquhar 1919–1945
- Archibald George Hardie 1945–1962
- Rowland Lemmon 1962–1975
- Bishop Anthony Hunter 1975–1979
- Timothy Withers Green 1979–1984
- Michael Middleton 1985–1992
- Canon Michael Nelson 1992–2004
- Canon Graham Usher 2004–2014
- Canon Dr Dagmar Winter 2015–2019
- Canon David Glover, KHC 2020

== Other notable clergy ==
- Reverend Thomas Henry Sparshott 1876, temporary junior curate

== Notable burials ==
- Ælfwald I of Northumbria
- Eata of Hexham
- Frithubeorht
- Acca of Hexham
- Alchmund of Hexham
- Henry Beaufort, 3rd Duke of Somerset
- Thomas de Ros, 9th Baron de Ros
- Robert Umfraville I (d. 1145)
- Odinel Umfraville I
- Gilbert de Umfraville
- Gilbert de Umfraville, Earl of Angus
- Matilda, Countess of Angus
- Robert Ogle (MP)
- Caleb Rotheram D.D. (1694–1752), dissenting minister and tutor

== See also ==
- Bishop of Hexham
- List of English abbeys, priories and friaries serving as parish churches
- List of monastic houses in Northumberland

== Sources ==
- Allsopp, Bruce; Clark, Ursula (1969). Historic Architecture of Northumberland. Newcastle upon Tyne: Oriel Press. ISBN 0-85362-062-8.
- Grundy, John (2022). History of Northumberland. Newcastle upon Tyne: Tyne Bridge Publishing. ISBN 9781838280970.
- Tomlinson, William Weaver (1920). Comprehensive Guide to the County of Northumberland (10th ed.). London: The Walter Scott Publishing Co Ltd.
