= Morrish =

Morrish may refer to:

== Surname ==
- Alfred Southcott Morrish (1906–1978), English organist and composer
- Ann Morrish (born 1928), British actress
- Ed Morrish, British radio comedy producer
- Jack Morrish (1915–2003), British trade unionist and politician
- James John Morrish (1868–1956), Australian politician
- Jay Morrish (1936–2015), American golf course designer
- Ken Morrish (1919– 2006), Metro Toronto politician
- Paul Morrish (born 1968), Australian rules footballer
- Rory Morrish (born 1968), Irish cross-country skier
- Sussie Morrish, Filipina–New Zealand professor of marketing
- Walter Morrish (1890–1974), provincial politician from Alberta, Canada
- William Snell Morrish (1844-1917) English Landscape Painter

== Places ==
- Morrish, Ontario
- Morrish Subdivision, Alberta, locality in Clearwater County, Alberta
- Morrish Public School, a school in Ontario

== Other ==
- Morrish Medal, Australian rules football award
- Morrish Besley (born 1927), Australian engineer,
