= Hexham Abbey high-altar cross =

1902 altar cross

- Artists: Herbert Maryon (design); Jeremiah Richardson (execution); Keswick School of Industrial Art
- Year: 1902
- Dimensions: 87 cm (34 in) high; 47 cm (19 in) wide (with base and arms)
- Location: Hexham Abbey, Northumberland, England

The Hexham Abbey high-altar cross is a metal-and-enamel cross placed on the main altar in Hexham Abbey in Northumberland, England. Designed by Herbert Maryon of the Keswick School of Industrial Art and executed by its craftsman Jeremiah Richardson, the cross was donated to the church by a parishioner in 1902, and unveiled on Good Friday that year. Two matching candlesticks were added in 1905, and another four in 1996; these now stand next to the cross, three on either side.

The cross comprises a concave base, a long shaft, arms, and a head that are possibly made of brass; an enamelled red boss surrounded by seven crystals sits in the centre. Including the base and arms, the cross is 87 cm (34 in) tall and 47 cm (19 in) wide. The shaft, arms, and head are slightly curved. The front of the cross, and the front and sides of the base, feature an interlaced Celtic knot in repoussé. The knot represents eternity; the seven crystals represent the seven churches of Hexham, and possibly also the seven canonised Bishops of Hexham. The cross combines elements of a Latin cross and crosses with curved arms and head, and echoes Norse motifs; the enamelled boss recalls the Hawell Monument, erected by the Reverend Hardwicke Rawnsley, the founder of the Keswick School.

The candlesticks are similar in design to the cross. Each features a base, long stem, and a candle holder. The two from 1905 were designed by Robert Hilton, who succeeded Maryon as director of the Keswick School the previous year, and feature a matching interlace pattern on all four sides; the four from 1996, which were designed to match the existing two, include the pattern on only the front. The 1905 candlesticks each include an inscription memorialising a man who died that year aged 24, and the 1996 candlestick has an inscription memorialising the former music director of Hexham Abbey.

At the time of its unveiling, The English Lakes Visitor wrote that the cross was "magnificent" and "the chief of the many beautiful works wrought at the School"; The Newcastle Daily Journal added that it was "indeed a work of art". In a speech at the end of 1902, Rawnsley highlighted the cross as one of the school's most important works that year. A 2001 history of the school termed the cross "delicately restrained in its design with clean simple lines".

== Background ==
=== Keswick School of Industrial Art ===
The Keswick School of Industrial Art was founded in 1884 by the Reverend Hardwicke Rawnsley and his wife Edith to offer classes in metal repoussé. Formed at the beginning of the Arts and Crafts movement, the school quickly expanded to include classes in drawing, design, woodcarving, and metalwork. The school melded commercial and artistic purposes; it sold items such as trays, frames, tables, and clock cases, and developed a reputation for quality.

In March 1900, Herbert Maryon was appointed as the first director of the school. Under Maryon's leadership, the Keswick School expanded the breadth and range of its designs; at the same time, Maryon executed several important commissions. His best works, wrote the historian of the school Ian Bruce, "drew their inspiration from the nature of the material and his deep understanding of its technical limits", and tended to be in metal. The school also employed craftsmen, numbering around a dozen by 1904. These included Jeremiah Richardson, who had joined the school as a pupil by 1891. Maryon remained at the school until December 1904, when he was succeeded by Robert Hilton. He later taught at the University of Reading and Armstrong College (then part of Durham University), then after the Second World War worked on the restoration of objects from Sutton Hoo for the British Museum.

== History ==
Diagram of the cross, showing its interlace patterns

The cross was purchased from the Keswick School by Dorothy Head as a gift to Hexham Abbey, a church in Hexham, Northumberland. (Note: Head commissioned at least two other pieces for the church. In 1917, she commissioned a memorial tablet to her late husband and son. Her husband, John Oswald Head, JP, was a churchwarden at Hexham Abbey, and died in 1914. Her son, Captain Reginald Head, died in April 1915 while fighting in the Gallipoli campaign. He had been married the previous year. In 1920, she dedicated a second memorial to her husband, a stained-glass window depicting Saint Andrew.) It was designed by Maryon and executed by Jeremiah Richardson. The enamelled centre was made by Lilian Hawthorn, then an art student aged about 22. (Note: Hawthorn moved to Hexham in 1939, and took an active role with the abbey. Among other activities she cared for the altar linen and brasses. When she died in 1964, her sister Clementine Mary Hawthorn donated a communion rail in her memory.) The cross was finished on 26 March 1902, and was installed on the altar two days later on Good Friday.

From 29 May to 2 June 1902—two months after the cross was gifted to Hexham—it was displayed at the Keswick School's stall at the Home Arts and Industries Association Exhibition at the Royal Albert Hall in London. The cross was placed at the centre of the stall. The school received approximately 66 awards for around three dozen works. Among these were two blue stars for the cross, recognising excellence in execution. The stall was visited by Queen Alexandra, the wife of King Edward VII; she bought a silver spoon designed by Isobel McBean and made by Robert Temple, and a silver jug designed and made by Temple. Princess Victoria and Maud of Wales each also bought similar silver spoons.

In 1905, a pair of candlesticks with a similar design was added to the altar. They were designed by Hilton, who took over from Maryon as director of the Keswick School that year, and were dedicated to Henry Robert Harrison, who died that year in Luxor at the age of 24. In 1996, four more were added. These were donated by Marilyn Atkinson in memory of her husband Terence Atkinson, MBE, who was the music director at Hexham from 1965 to 1985, and who died in 1994. They were dedicated by Alec Graham, the Bishop of Newcastle, on 27 October 1996.

As of 2026, the cross and the candlesticks remain on Hexham Abbey's high altar. Three candlesticks stand on either side of the cross.

== Description ==
=== Altar cross ===
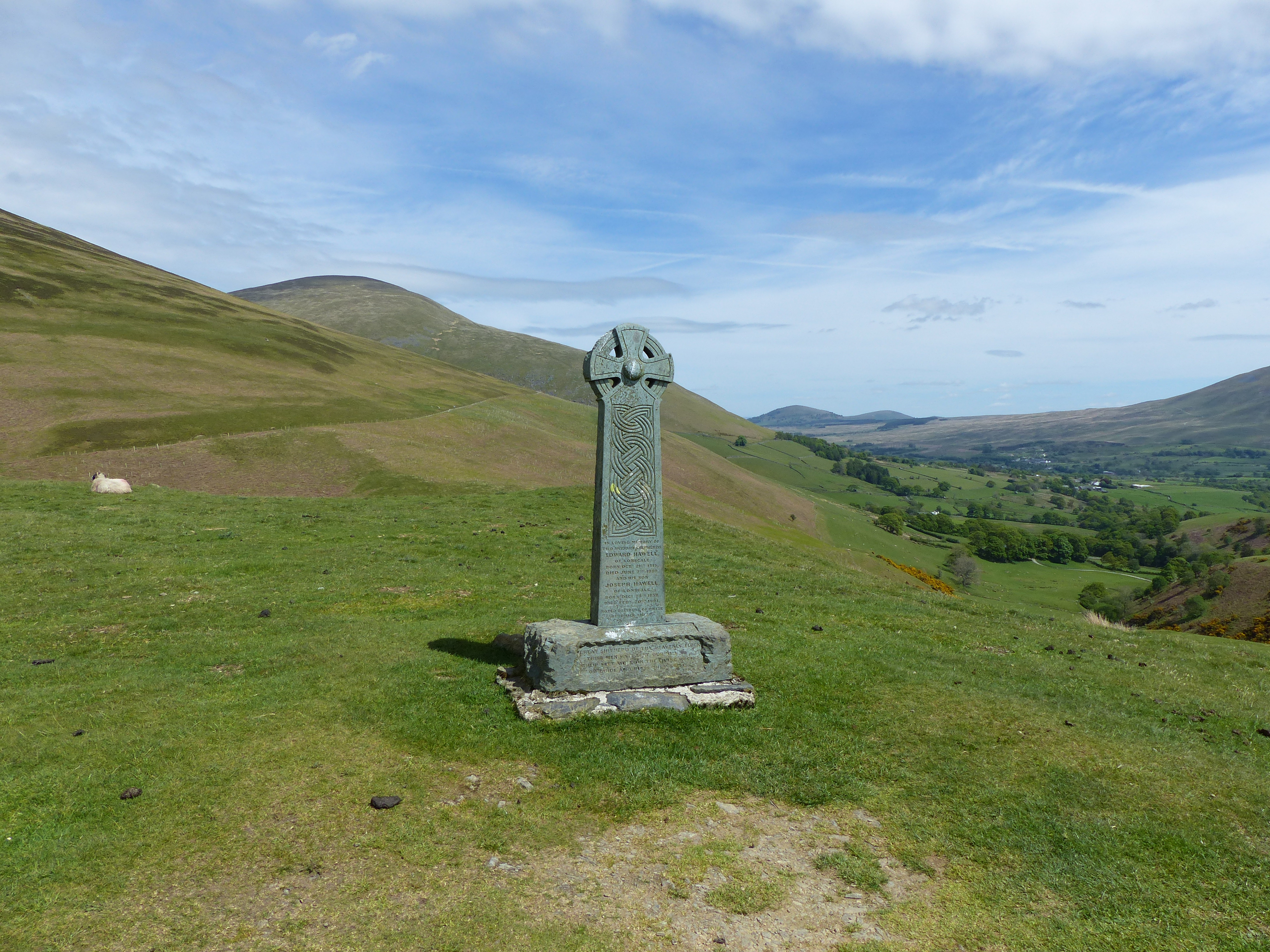
The Hawell Monument

The cross comprises a concave base, long shaft, arms, and head. It is made primarily of metal (possibly brass (Note: The sources do not expressly state the type of metal out of which the cross is made, nor do they state whether the crystals surrounding the boss are natural crystals or lead glass. An obituary of Hawthorn termed the metal objects on the high altar "brasses".)), stands 87 cm (34 in) tall at the base, and measures 47 cm (19 in) wide at the arms. The shaft, arms, and head are slightly curved. The front of the cross, and the front and sides of the base, feature an interlaced Celtic knot in repoussé. In the centre of the cross is a boss made of red enamel, surrounded by seven crystals; the seven represent the seven churches of Hexham and possibly also the seven canonised Bishops of Hexham. The colour of the enamel, according to Edwin Savage—the rector of Hexham when the cross was presented—represents "the Lamb that was slain from the Foundation of the World".

According to The English Lakes Visitor and The Newcastle Daily Journal, the cross combines elements of a Latin cross and crosses that have curved arms and head. According to Ian Bruce, writing in a 2001 history of the Keswick School, the endless knot symbolises eternity. The cross draws upon Norse motifs, he added, and the enamelled boss echoes the Hawell Monument, erected by Rawnsley.

=== Candlesticks ===
High altar with cross and candlesticks

Though executed nine decades apart, the six candlesticks flanking the cross share a similar design. Each stands 64 cm (25 in) high and measures 23 cm (9.1 in) across at the base. Each has a square base with a curved upper section connected to a long, square stem which is topped by a square candle holder.

On the two candlesticks from 1905, the base (including the upper curved area) and the stem of each side display an interlace pattern. The four from 1996 contain the same interlace pattern but only on the front.

Each of the six candlesticks is inscribed. On those from 1905, an inscription in capital letters winds around the four sides of the base: "Ad gloriam Dei et in memoriam / Henrici Roberti Harrison / Qui obiit anno salutis MDCCCCV / Suae aetatis XXIV", translating to "To the glory of God and in memory of Henry Robert Harrison / Who died in the year of salvation 1905 / Aged 24". The inscriptions on the four candlesticks from 1996 are on the back, set across two lines in capital letters: "A.D.G.M. In memory of / Terence Atkinson M.B.E. obit 18-11-1994". The acronym stands for "Ad Deo Gloriam Majorem, translating as "To the Greater Glory of God".

=== Gallery ===
Base

With innermost candlesticks

From above

From below

Side

Arms

Detail of boss

== Reception ==
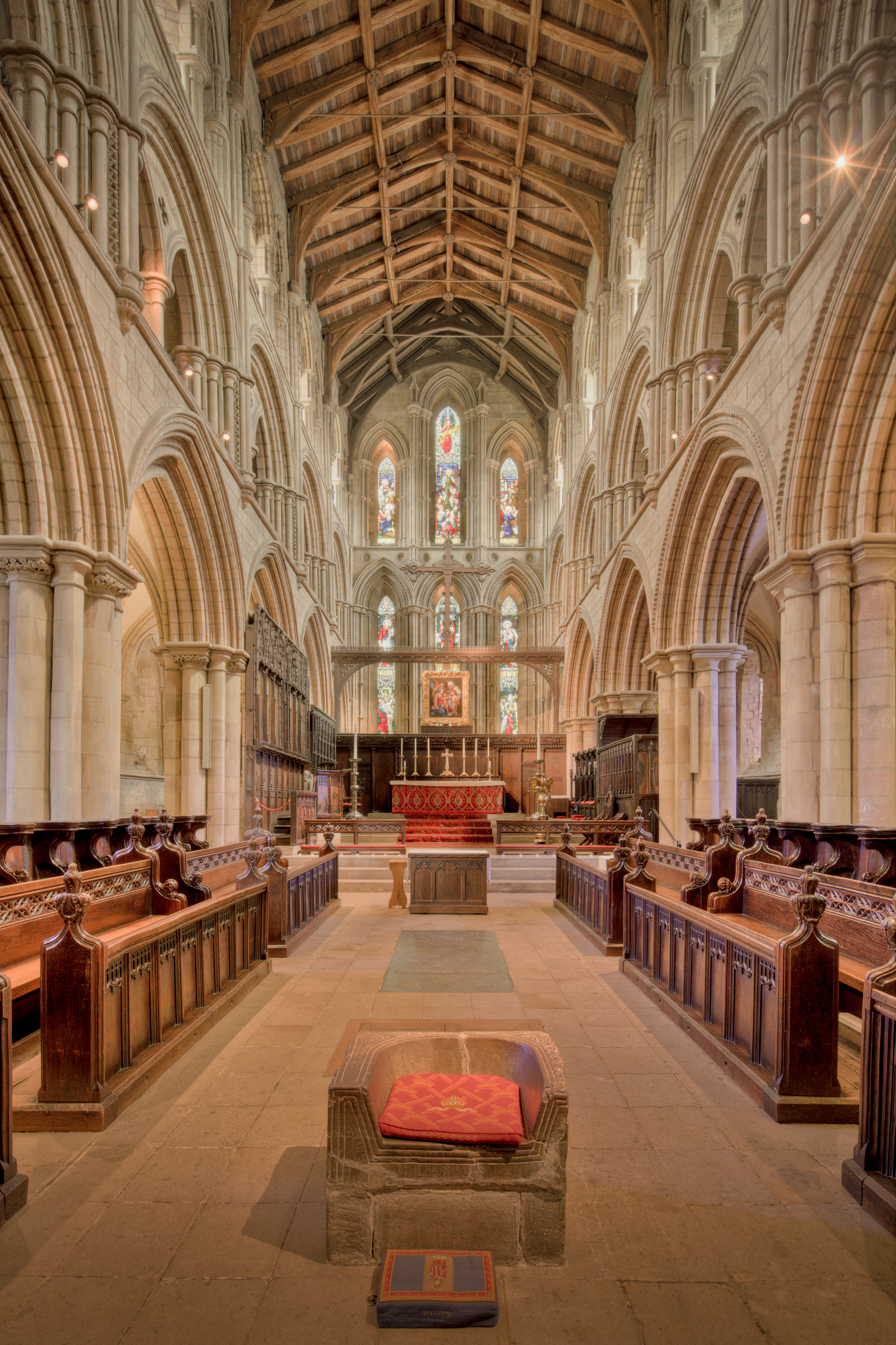
Interior of Hexham Abbey, with the cross and candlesticks visible on the altar

The day after the cross was unveiled, The English Lakes Visitor wrote that it was "a magnificent altar cross, which, without the slightest hesitation, may be classed the chief of the many beautiful works wrought at the School". In a similar column the following week, The Newcastle Daily Journal praised Maryon's "skilful" design, and wrote that "The cross is indeed a work of art, and no trouble has been spared to make it in design and workmanship worthy of its sacred symbolism and the noble Abbey." Both papers termed the interlace design "exquisite", and the cross "pleasingly proportional in appearance" and "worthy of a place on the Communion table of the fine and interesting old Hexham Abbey".

In November 1902, in an address opening the winter session of the school, Rawnsley included the cross among the most important works created by the school that year. Other such works Rawnsley highlighted included a casket presented to Princess Louise upon her visit to the school (designed by Maryon, executed by Richardson, Temple, and Thomas Clark, and enamelled by Maryon's sister Mildred Maryon); a processional cross for a church in Leeds; a tablet for Kendal Savings Bank; two tablets for St Kentigern's Church in Crosthwaite; the jug purchased by the Queen; a gold cross for Whitelands College; a challenge shield for Morecambe; and a memorial tablet for Queen Victoria.

In his 2001 history of the school, Bruce wrote that the cross is "delicately restrained in its design with clean simple lines".

== Bibliography ==
- Bruce, Ian (2001). The Loving Eye and Skilful Hand: The Keswick School of Industrial Arts. Carlisle: Bookcase. OCLC 80891576.
