= Alchmund of Hexham =

8th-century Bishop of Hexham

Eahlmund
- Bishop of Hexham
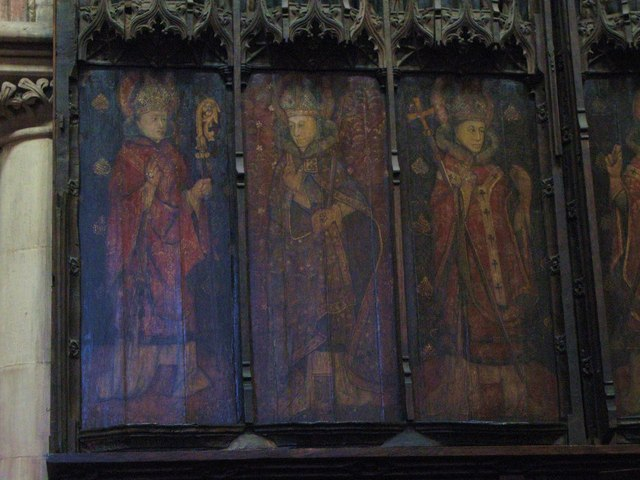
- Appointed: before 24 April 767
- Term ended: 7 September 780 or 781
- Predecessor: Frithubeorht
- Successor: Tilbeorht

Orders
- Consecration: 24 April 767

Personal details
- Died: 7 September 780 or 781 Hexham, Northumberland
- Denomination: Christian

Sainthood
- Feast day: 7 September
- Venerated in: Catholic Church; Anglican Communion
- Shrines: Hexham Abbey, Northumberland

Alcmund of Hexham (Note: Also spelt Ealhmund, Alhmund or Alchmund) (died 7 September 780 or 781) became the 7th bishop of the see of Hexham in Northumberland when he was consecrated on 24 April 767; the see was centred on the church there founded by Wilfrid.

Alcmund died on 7 September 780 or 781 and was buried beside Acca outside the church. Virtually nothing is now known of his life, but he was apparently deeply venerated as one of the Hexham saints.

== Relics ==
By the early 11th century, after the Danes had ravaged this part of the country, it seems that his tomb had been entirely forgotten. Symeon of Durham writes that Alcmund appeared in a vision to Dregmo, a man of Hexham, urging him to tell Alfred son of Westou, sacrist of Durham, to have his body translated (removed and re-buried as a relic). Alfred did so, but stole one of the bones to take back with him to Durham; the shrine however could not be moved by any strength of man until the bone was replaced.

In 1154, the church, having been ruined again, was again restored, and the bones of the Hexham saints, including Alcmund, were gathered into a single shrine. The Scots however pillaged and finally destroyed both church and shrine in a border raid in 1296.

== Citations ==
Christian titles
Preceded by Frithubeorht	Bishop of Hexham; 767–780 or 781	Succeeded by Tilbeorht
