= Tidfrith =

Tidfrith or Tidferth may refer to:

- Tidfrith (Dunwich) (fl. 798–c. 820), bishop of Dunwich
- Tidfrith (Hexham) (fl. 810s), bishop of Hexham
