= Beadwulf =

- Bishop of Candida Casa
- Church: Roman Catholic
- See: Candida Casa
- In office: 791 – after 803
- Predecessor: Æthelberht
- Successor: none
- Previous post: unknown

Personal details
- Born: unknown unknown
- Died: after 803 unknown

Beadwulf was the last Bishop of Candida Casa to be consecrated by the Northumbrian Archbishop of York. He appears in four years of the chronicles and nowhere else. Nothing else is known of him, and his sole historical significance is that he was a bishop of the short-lived Northumbrian See of Candida Casa at Whithorn in southern Scotland.

Beadwulf (alternately spelled Baldwulf, Badulf, Badwulf, or Baldulf) enters the historical record at his consecration as the Bishop of Candida Casa by Archbishop Eanbald I on 17 July 791, after his predecessor at Candida Casa, Æthelberht, was made the Bishop of Hexham. On 26 May 795 he attended the consecration of King Eardwulf of Northumbria at York, and then on 14 August 796 he attended the consecration of Eanbald II at Sockburn as the new Archbishop of York. On 11 June 803 Beadwulf attended the consecration of Egbert at Bywell as the new Bishop of Lindisfarne. No further record exists, either of him or of the See of Candida Casa.

== Historical context ==
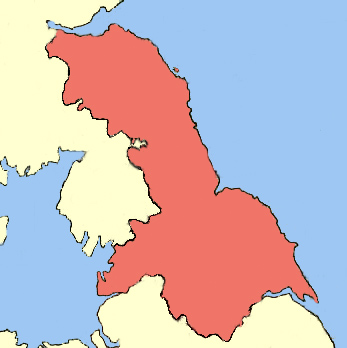
The Kingdom of Northumbria c. 800. The borders are conjectural.

The latter part of the eighth century was a tumultuous era in Northumbrian history. During Beadwulf's tenure at Candida Casa, the nation was weakened by dynastic strife within its leadership, with kings regularly murdered, deposed, or exiled. Vikings were beginning their increasingly destructive raids on Northumberland, sacking Lindisfarne in 793 and Jarrow in 794. The bishoprics were also in decline and if there is any foundation for Alcuin's 796 letter to the clergy of York regarding simony, ecclesiastical offices were available for purchase. The kingdom was in its final throes, and in 827 when the appearance of Egbert of Wessex and his army at Dore was sufficient to obtain Northumbrian submission, the once-dominant Kingdom of Northumbria disappeared into history.

William of Malmesbury says that the bishopric at Candida Casa was depopulated and destroyed by the incursions of Picts and Scots. There is no evidence to suggest any large-scale predations in Galloway at this time, but whether or not that was the case, it is certainly likely that the bishopric simply withered and died along with the other Northumbrian bishoprics.

== Historical evidence ==
A mention of Beadwulf in the Anglo-Saxon Chronicle

The various chronicles that mention Beadwulf contain occasional minor differences in the dating of events. These variations are noted below. No one date is more authoritative than another.

791 – His consecration as Bishop of Candida Casa

The Saxon Chronicle says that Beadwulf was consecrated bishop of Candida Casa by Archbishop Eanbald I and Bishop Æthelberht of Hexham on 17 July 791. Symeon of Durham, writing c. 1108, says that the consecration occurred in a place called "Hearrahaleh". Henry of Huntingdon, writing c. 1155, says that the consecration was by Eanbald I.

795 – At the consecration of King Eardwulf

The Saxon Chronicle says that Eardwulf succeeded to the Northumbrian kingdom on 14 May 795, and was consecrated on 26 May 795 at York by Archbishop Eanbald I and bishops Æthelberht of Hexham, Higbald of Lindisfarne, and Beadwulf.

796 – At the consecration of Archbishop Eanbald II

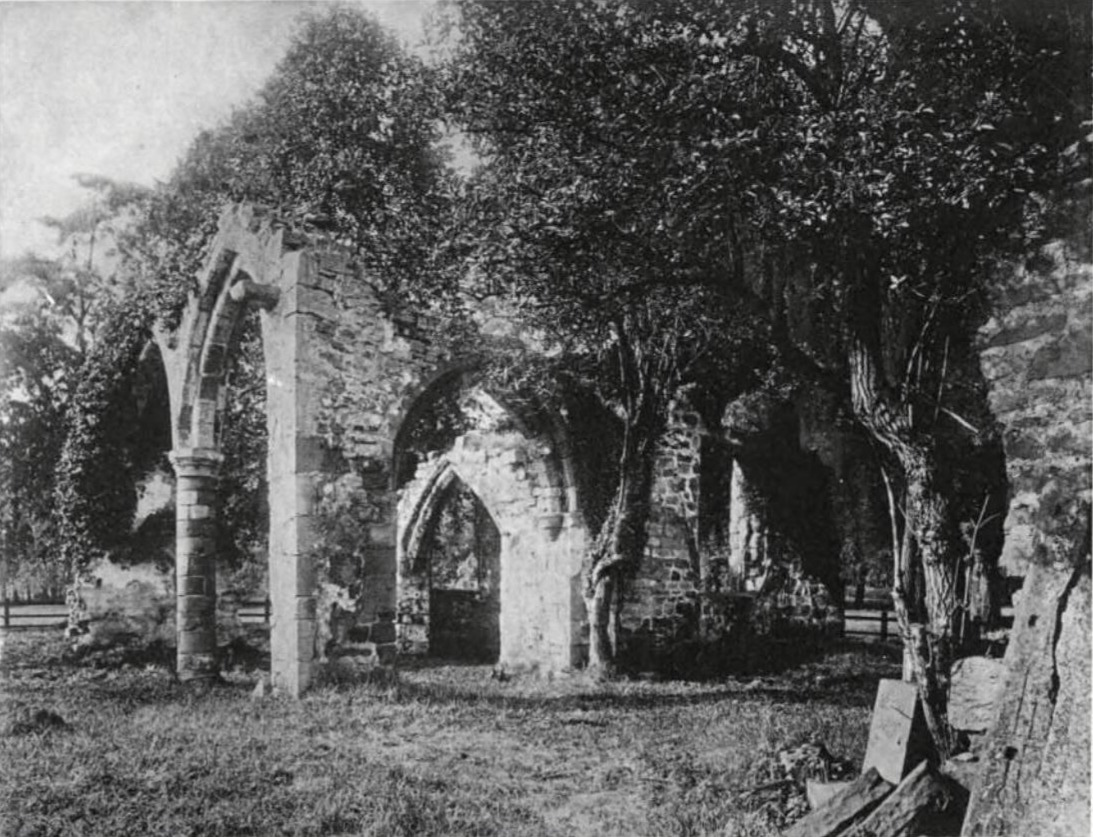
The remains of Sockburn Church (from an 1894 book).

The Saxon Chronicle says that Archbishop Eanbald I died on 10 August 796 and was succeeded by Eanbald II, who was consecrated on 14 August 796. There is no mention of who attended, or the place. Symeon of Durham says that the consecration occurred at Sockburn, with bishops Æthelberht, Higbald, and Beadwulf attending. The Melrose Chronicle agrees that the three bishops attended the consecration, but makes no mention of its location.

803 – At the consecration of Bishop Egbert of Lindisfarne

The Saxon Chronicle for 803 says that Bishop Higbald of Lindisfarne died on 24 June 803, and was succeeded by Egbert on 13 June 804. There is no mention of who attended, or the place. Symeon of Durham says that Higbald died on 25 May 803, and that Egbert's consecration was on 11 June 803 at Bywell, with Archbishop Eanbald II and bishops Eanbert of Hexham and Beadwulf in attendance. John of Worcester, writing in 1140, says that Higbald died in 802 and that his successor Egbert was consecrated by Archbishop Eanbald II on 2 June 802.

== Notes ==
Religious titles
Preceded by Æthelberht	Bishop of Whithorn; 789 × 791–803 ×	Succeeded by Unknown; Next known bishop is: Heathored (uncertain); Gilla Aldan (certain)
