= Newell Smith Wallbank =

Newell Smith Wallbank (26 April 1875 - 23 June 1945) was a British composer of pipe organ music. He was an Organist of Wakefield Cathedral from 1930 until his death in 1945.

== Early life ==
Wallbank was born in Oakworth, Yorkshire as the son of William Wallbank. He studied the organ under the tutelage of Edwin Crow at Ripon Cathedral.

He married Alice Mary Batt, the daughter of Albert Batt, on 14 March 1913, at St George's Church, Leeds; they had a son, the Revd Prebendary Newell Eddius Wallbank (1914-1996), who married the educationalist Phyllis Wallbank.

== Appointments ==
- Organist of All Souls, Blackman Lane, Leeds until 1911
- Organist of Hexham Abbey 1911 - 1917
- Organist of St Margaret's Church, Altrincham 1917 - 1918 (Patron: the Earl of Stamford)
- Organist of Hexham Abbey 1918 - 1926
- Organist of Lancaster Priory 1926 - 1928
- Organist of St Mary's Church, Scarborough 1928 - 1930
- Organist of Wakefield Cathedral 1930 - 1945.

== Compositions ==
Wallbank composed many works including:

- Six Choral Preludes for the Organ
- Concerto Grosso for String Orchestra
- Partita in E for String Orchestra.

== See also ==
- List of musicians at English cathedrals
