= Wakefield Cathedral =

- Cathedral Church of All Saints
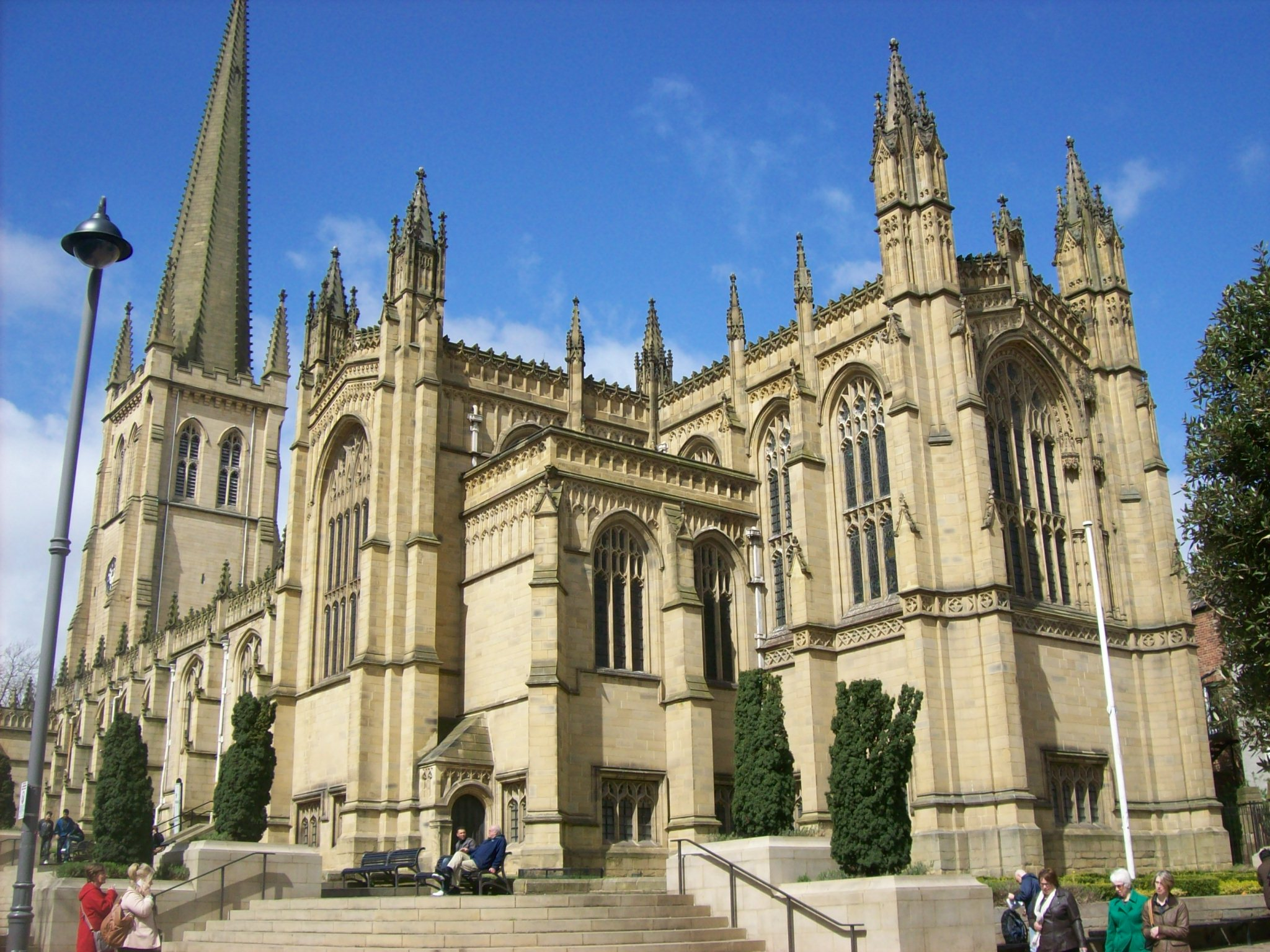
- Wakefield Cathedral

- Shown within West Yorkshire
- 53°40′59″N 1°29′49″W
- OS grid reference: SE 33332 20841
- Location: Wakefield, West Yorkshire
- Country: England
- Denomination: Church of England
- Previous denomination: Roman Catholic
- Tradition: Liberal Anglo-Catholic
- Website: www.wakefield-cathedral.org.uk

Architecture
- Heritage designation: Grade I listed building
- Architect(s): George Gilbert Scott; John Loughborough Pearson
- Style: Gothic
- Years built: c. 1300–1905

Administration
- Province: York
- Diocese: Leeds
- Archdeaconry: Pontefract
- Deanery: Wakefield
- Parish: All Saints, Wakefield

Clergy
- Bishop: Anglican Bishop of Leeds
- Dean: Philip Hobday

Wakefield Cathedral, or the Cathedral Church of All Saints in Wakefield, West Yorkshire, England, is a co-equal Anglican cathedral with Bradford and Ripon Cathedrals, in the Diocese of Leeds and a seat of the Bishop of Leeds. Originally the parish church, it has Anglo Saxon origins and, after enlargement and rebuilding, has the tallest spire in Yorkshire. Its 247-foot (75 m) spire is the tallest structure in the City of Wakefield. The cathedral was designated a Grade I listed building on 14 July 1953.

== History ==
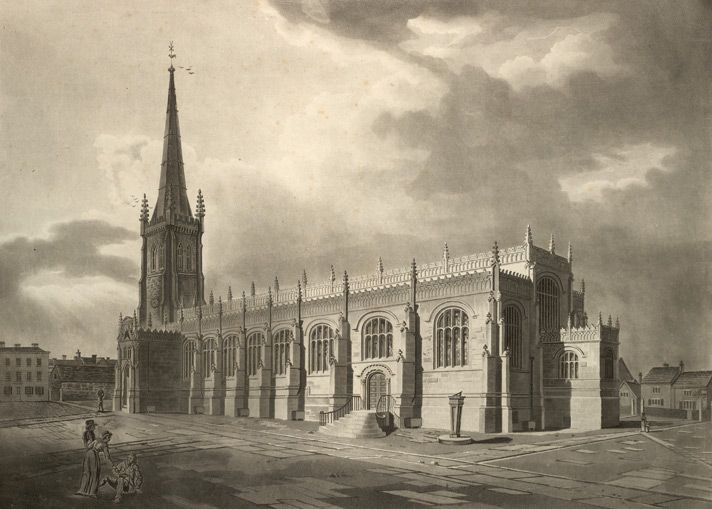
The parish church in 1807, before the transept was added

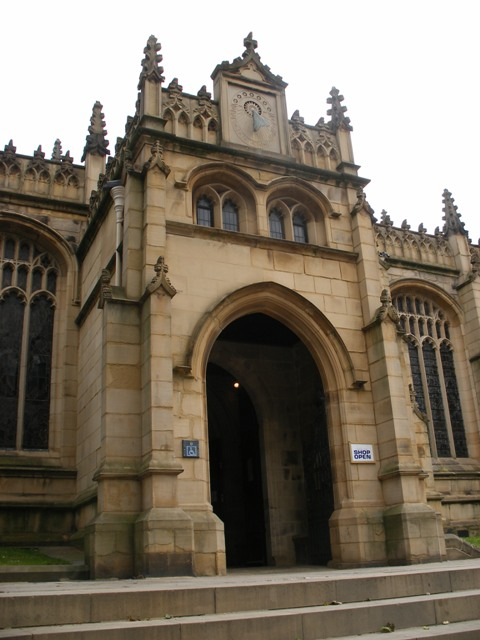
Wakefield Cathedral south porch and sundial

The cathedral, situated in the centre of Wakefield on a hill on Kirkgate, (Note: "The "gate" suffix derives from Old Norse gata meaning road and kirk, from kirkja indicating there was a church.") is built on the site of a Saxon church, evidence of which was uncovered in 1900 when extensions to the east end were made. A church in Wakefield is mentioned in the Domesday Book of 1086. In 1090 William II gave the church and land in Wakefield to Lewes Priory in Sussex, and shortly after that a Norman church was built.

The Norman church was rebuilt in 1329, and apart from the tower and spire, was again rebuilt and enlarged in 1469. The church was reconstructed and altered at various times and its spire, damaged in a violent gale, was renewed in 1823. Up to the 16th century the church was known by the Anglo Saxon All Hallows but after the Reformation changed to All Saints.

All Saints' Church was largely rebuilt in the Perpendicular Gothic style in the early-15th century and, after years of neglect was again rebuilt in the 18th century. It owes its current late-mediaeval appearance to a Victorian restoration by George Gilbert Scott and his son John Oldrid Scott between 1858 and 1874.

In 1888, the Diocese of Wakefield was created and the parish church became the cathedral of the diocese. It still served as a parish church, meaning that until 2000 the head of the chapter of canons was called the provost, rather than the dean. Treacy Hall, built in memory of Bishop Eric Treacy, was completed in 1982.

In January 2000 a parish boundary change brought the chantry chapel on Wakefield Bridge into the care of the cathedral.

In 2005 Queen Elizabeth II visited the cathedral to distribute Maundy money.

In 2012 the cathedral, with £1.58 million from the Heritage Lottery funding, had raised £2.5 million to restore and reorder the nave which was cleared of its oak pews to create an open space for worship, public events and celebrations. A decision to charge VAT on restoration work on historic buildings in the 2012 budget caused concern that the project would be halted or delayed.

The cathedral archives are held at West Yorkshire Archive Service in Wakefield.

Peregrine falcons have nested on the cathedral's tower since 2015 and raised 24 chicks in seven breeding seasons. They attract much interest locally and across the UK and internationally.

== Structure ==
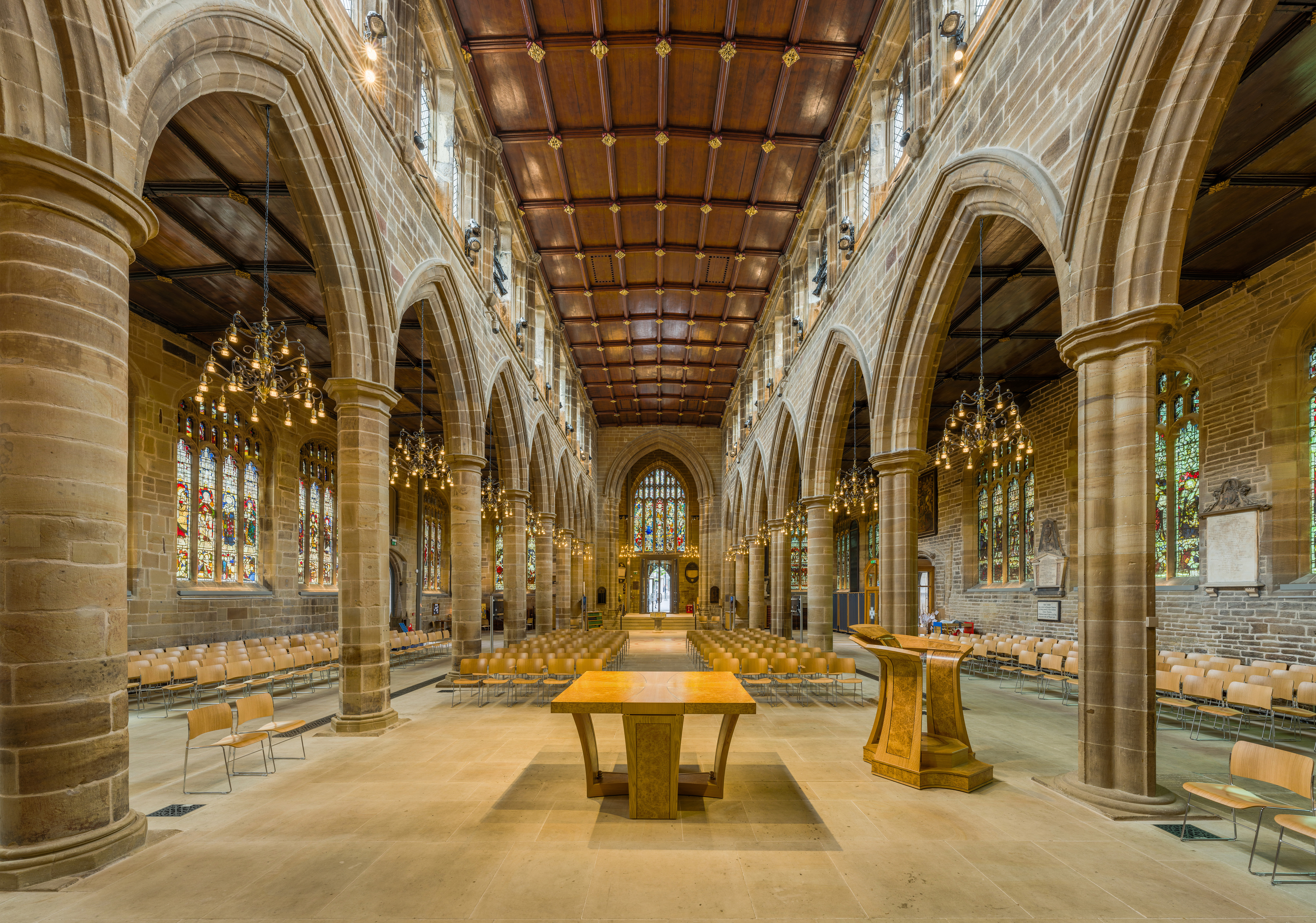
The nave looking west

The cathedral walls are clad in ashlar sandstone. On the south wall is a porch, with a wrought iron gate and a sundial over the door arch. The wall of the north aisle is the oldest part of the church dating from about 1150. The nave piers date from the 12th and 13th centuries and the arcade and chancel arches date from the 14th century. The late 15th-century chancel now serves as the choir. The nave's original stone vaulted roof has been replaced with wood. The 15th-century wooden ceilings over the nave and aisles have carved bosses.

The current chancel, a transept and St Mark's Chapel were built at the east end in 1904 to designs by John Loughborough Pearson and completed by his son, Frank L Pearson. The 20th-century chancel has a stone vaulted roof.

The cathedral's four-stage west tower has angle buttresses and a very tall crocketed spire behind an embattled parapet with crocketed corner pinnacles and at 247 feet (75 m) tall, is the highest spire in Yorkshire.

The Treacy Hall was added to the cathedral in 1982 and is used by the congregations and community groups.

== Fixtures and fittings ==
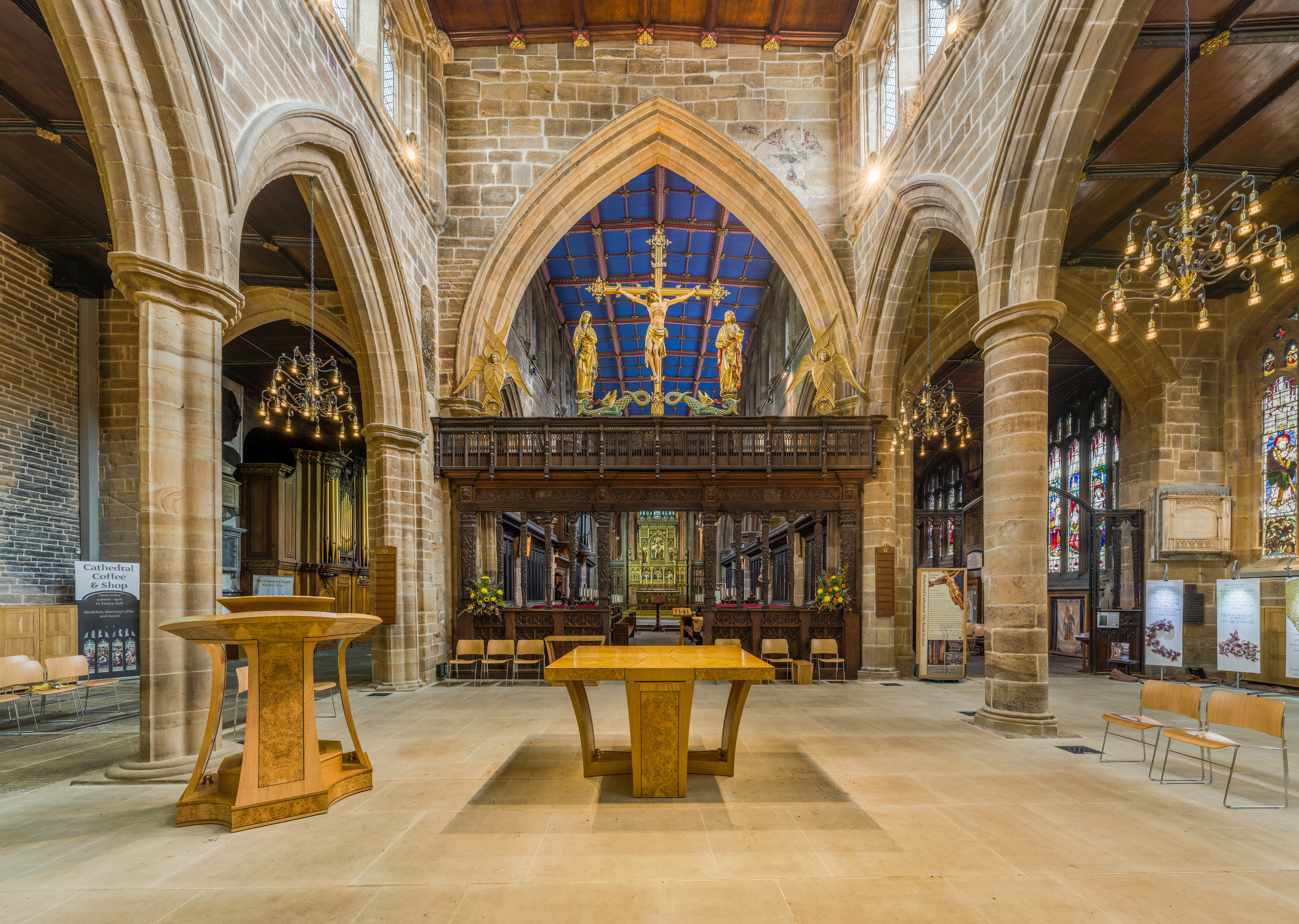
The rood screen

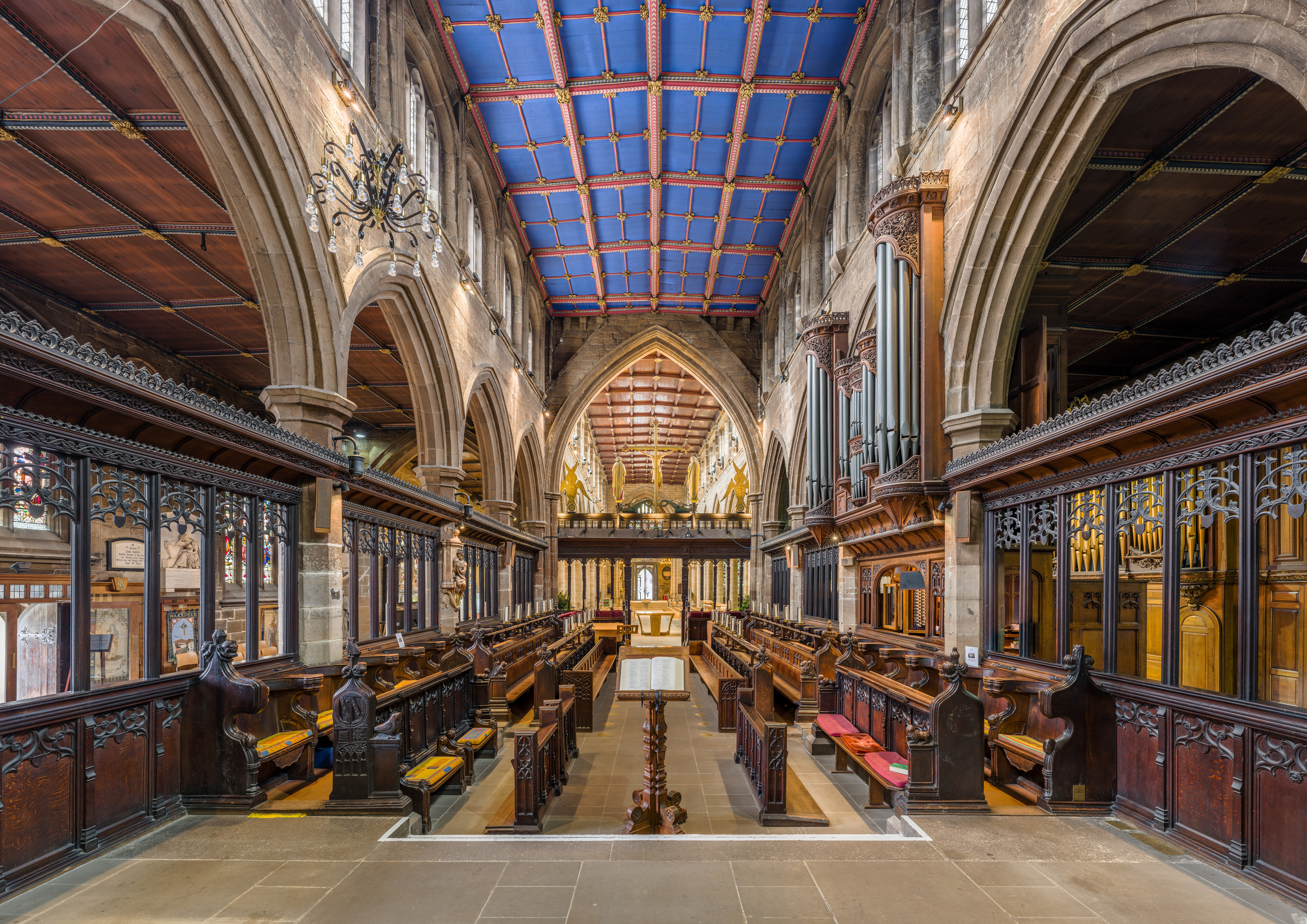
The choir

The cathedral's windows have some panel tracery. None of the medieval stained glass survives and most of the cathedral's glass was created by Charles Eamer Kempe who created many windows over 50 years. His windows are reminiscent in colour of those of the late Middle Ages, darker on the north wall with Old Testament themes and lighter on the south side where he placed New Testament figures.

The cathedral has a 17th-century rood screen and above it a rood by Ninian Comper completed in 1950. The font dates from the mid 17th-century and the pulpit from 1708. Eleven of the 15th-century choir stalls, the gift of Thomas Savile, have misericords and other carvings including a Green Man and mythical beasts.

The reredos is the work of John Oldrid Scott and possibly incorporates earlier works while the high altar is by Frank Pearson. Some furniture in St Mark's Chapel is by Robert Thompson, the 'Mouseman', so called because of his signature mouse carvings. The cathedral has a fine collection of church plate. A monument to Lyon Pilkington dates from about 1700 and other memorial tablets are from the 18th and early 19th centuries.

The organ built by Abbott and Smith in 1902, has a case made in 1743. It was rebuilt by John Compton of London in 1951–52 and rebuilt and restored by Phillip Wood and Sons of Huddersfield in 1985.

The cathedral tower has a ring of 14 bells including a 35-1-0 cwt, (note C) tenor, a flat 6th (note B flat), and extra treble (note A), to give a light 10 in (note F) (tenor 14 cwt). No more than 12 bells are usually rung at any one time. Practices range from rounds and call changes on six up to "Surprise Maximus". The bells are rung on Sundays, and to mark special occasions such as weddings and national events such as the Diamond Jubilee of Elizabeth II.

== Dean and chapter ==
As of 10 January 2026:

- Dean – The Very Revd Dr Philip Hobday (since 10 January 2026 licensing)
- Diocesan Canon – The Revd Canon Dr Erik Peeters (since 23 January 2025 installation)
- Canon Precentor – The Revd Canon Dr Kathryn Goldsmith (since 17 January 2024 installation)

== Music ==
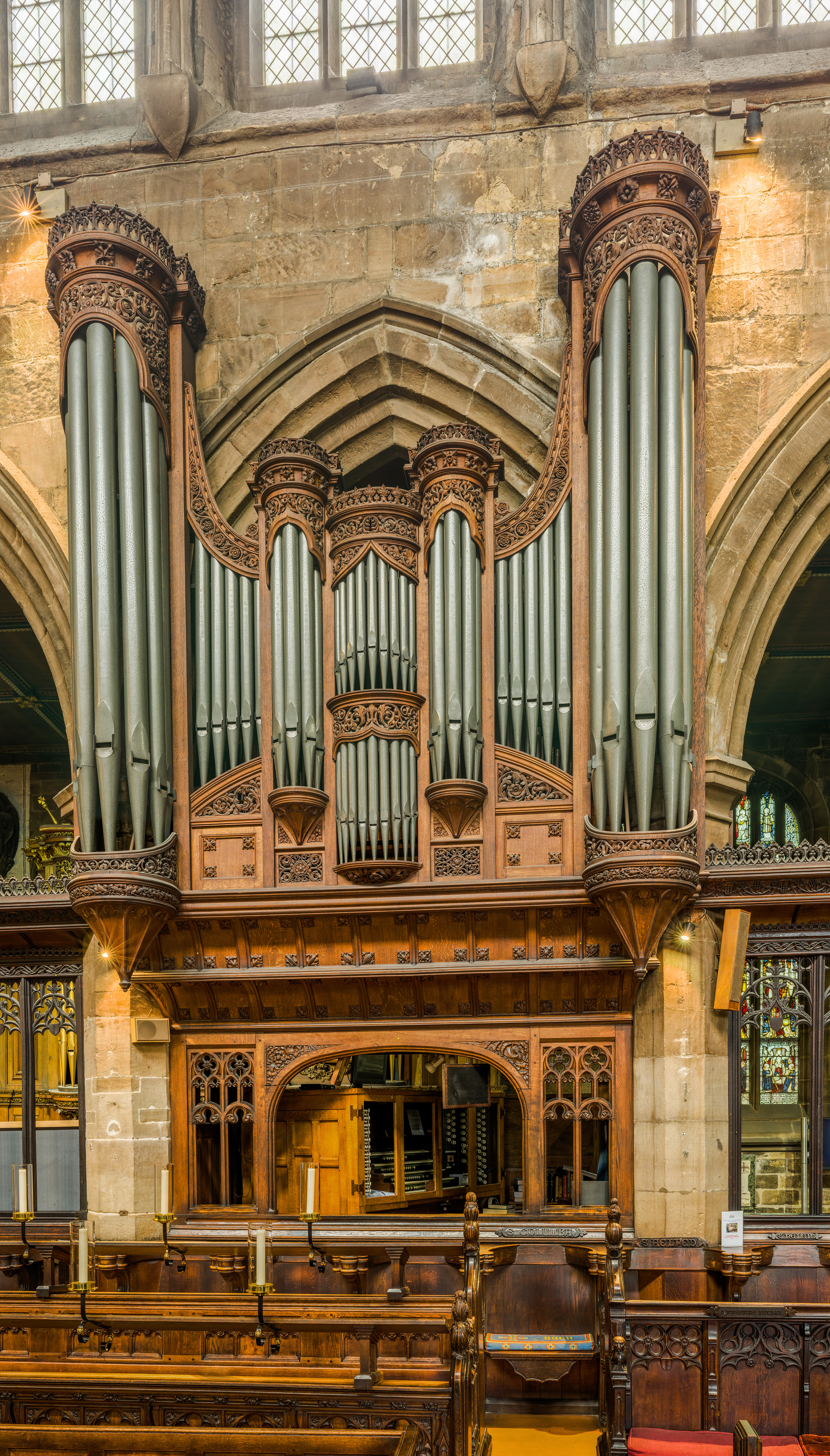
The choir organ

Wakefield Cathedral Choir consists of boys, girls and adults who perform at the cathedral and have appeared on BBC One's Songs of Praise and BBC Radio 3's Choral Evensong. In 1992 Wakefield Cathedral became only the second cathedral in Britain to accept female choristers.

The cathedral has had seven organists since 1888, of which Jonathan Bielby, MBE was the longest serving organist in an English cathedral. Previous organists have included composer Newell Smith Wallbank. Assistant organists have included William Frederick Dunnill and John Scott.

== See also ==
- Grade I listed churches in West Yorkshire
- Listed buildings in Wakefield
- St John the Baptist's Church, Wakefield, West Yorkshire
