= ABC Cinemas =

British cinema chain

- Type: Cinema chain
- Industry: Motion picture projection activities media industry
- Founded: 1927 (original); 1995 (revival)
- Defunct: 1986 (original); 2000 (revival); 2021 (brand)
- Fate: Acquired by the Cannon Group (original); Merged with Odeon Cinemas (revival)
- Successor: Cannon Cinemas (original); Odeon Cinemas (revival)
- Headquarters: London, United Kingdom
- Parent: Associated British Picture Corporation (1927–1969); EMI (1969–1979); Thorn EMI (1979–1986); Cannon Group (1986–1992); MGM (1992–1995); Cinven (1995–2000)

ABC Cinemas (Associated British Cinemas) was a cinema chain in the United Kingdom. Originally a wholly owned subsidiary of Associated British Picture Corporation (ABPC), it operated between the 1920s and the 1980s. The brand name was reused in the 1990s until 2000.

== History ==
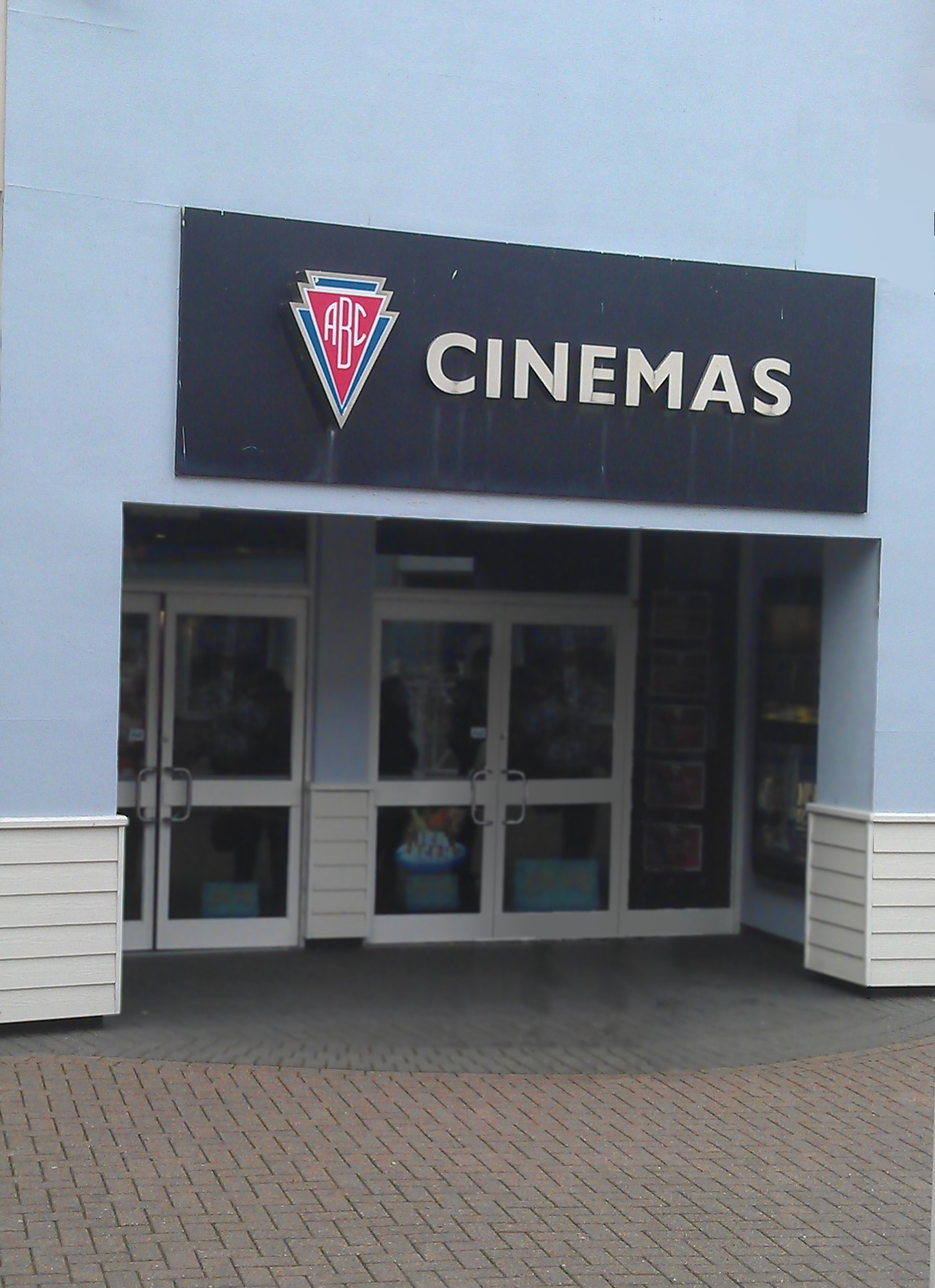
The Old ABC Cinema at Butlins Bognor Regis, West Sussex. Replaced by Character Theatre and Discovery Studio in 2013.

=== Early years ===
ABC Cinemas was established in 1927 by solicitor John Maxwell by merging three smaller Scottish cinema circuits. It became a wholly owned cinema subsidiary of British International Pictures when it was merged with the production arm of British National Pictures Studios, which had been formed by Maxwell in 1926.

During the 1930s, it grew rapidly by acquisitions and an ambitious building programme under the direction of chief architect W. R. Glen, who had been appointed in about 1929 and maintained a distinct house style. It acquired First National Pathé Limited which gave it trading connections to First National Pictures in the United States. Existing cinemas which could not be re-modelled were usually operated as separate circuits. In 1937, the parent company, BIP, was renamed Associated British Picture Corporation (ABPC). ABC also ran cinemas under the Ritz brand such as the Ritz Cinema, Muswell Hill.

After he died in 1940, his widow Catherine sold a large number of shares to Warner Bros., who eventually became the largest shareholders and able to exercise control, though ABPC was separately quoted on the London Stock Exchange.

By 1945, it operated over 400 cinemas (usually called the Savoy or Regal) and was second only to Rank's Odeon and Gaumont chains. By the close of the 1950s, ABC had started rebranding most cinemas as ABC and dropped names like Regal. UK exhibition was characterised by alignments between distributors and exhibitors. ABC had access to Warner Brothers, MGM and its own ABPC productions, whereas rival Rank had 20th Century Fox, Paramount, Walt Disney, Columbia, Universal, United Artists and its own productions. Rival ABC, Odeon and Gaumont cinemas in a town showed their own releases and barred each other from showing the same film.

Television led to a sharp decline in cinema audiences after 1952, though with the coming of commercial television from 1955 ABPC had expanded into the new medium with the creation of ABC Television Limited, which gained the Independent Television contracts for the North of England and Midlands at the weekend. ABC-TV lost its franchises in 1968 and was merged with Rediffusion to become Thames Television.

As a result of the decline, many suburban ABC theatres closed. Most of those remaining began, from the late 1950s to lose their individual names and were simply branded "ABC". In 1959 Rank abandoned the separate Odeon and Gaumont release and put the best cinemas from each circuit onto a new Rank release. The remaining cinemas were given a new "national" release but this was unattractive to distributors and in 1961 Paramount switched to ABC after refusing a "national" release for the Dean Martin comedy All in a Night's Work. The "national" release soon ended entirely and there were in future just ABC and Odeon release patterns. In 1967, Seven Arts, the new owners of Warner, decided to dispose of its holdings in ABPC and subsequently EMI launched a successful take-over bid for the company. Associated British Picture Corporation was later to be renamed Thorn-EMI Screen Entertainment Ltd, although the cinema chain retained its name. In 1986, this was later divested by EMI to the Australian businessman Alan Bond who sold the EMI film/cinema assets a few days later to the Cannon Group for a reported £50 million profit in seven days. EMI retained ABPC's lucrative television interests. Eventually, the advent of largely American-owned multiplexes led to the end of barring and the old distributor alignments, which had in any case been rendered largely irrelevant by cinema closures often leaving only one cinema in a town, which had access to all films but usually had to give precedence to its traditional alignment (so an Odeon might have a poor "Rank" release in its biggest screen and a big "ABC" release in a small cinema and vice versa).

==== ABC Minors ====
In the 1940s, ABC set up the first major Saturday cinema club for children, "The ABC Minors". At the beginning of each Saturday morning session, the "ABC Minors Song" would be played to the tune of 'Blaze Away' by Abe Holzmann (1874–1939), whilst the lyrics were presented on the screen with a bouncing red ball above the words to help the audience keep the place.

=== The challenge of the multiplex ===
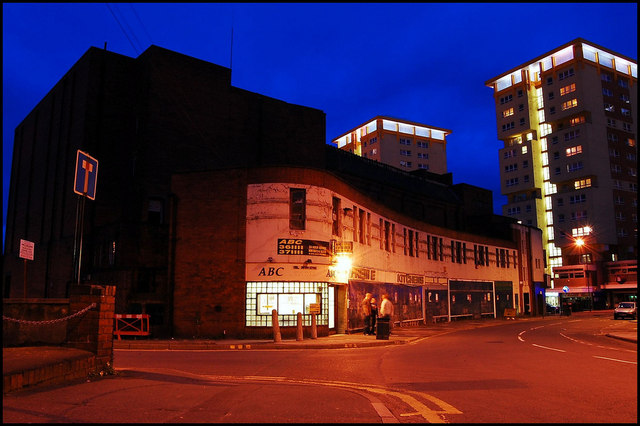
The ABC Cinema, Wakefield was closed in 1997, only months after Cineworld opened a multiplex in the city

In the late 1980s, on the verge of bankruptcy, Cannon was taken over by Italian financier Giancarlo Parretti, who then changed the company's name to Pathé Communications, which subsequently bought Metro-Goldwyn-Mayer (MGM). These Cannon cinemas, along with a group of cinemas Cannon owned in the Netherlands, were used as part of a phony transaction by Parretti to a holding company purportedly owned by Italian media mogul and future Prime Minister of Italy Silvio Berlusconi, Cinema V; Cinema V was a shell company owned by Parretti's business partner Florio Fiorini, to make it appear that Pathé was paying off their debts to their bank, Credit Lyonnais Bank Nederland, when, in reality, the bank's loans to Pathé had expanded tremendously (including the $184 million supposedly paid by Cinema V); this was done to prevent the Dutch central bank from finding out about the deepening connection between CLBN, Parretti and Fiorini.

In any case, even after Parretti was arrested and Credit Lyonnais seized control of MGM in 1992, the new company began opening its own multiplexes as MGM Cinemas. The existing few Cannon multiplexes were also rebranded as MGM Cinemas. MGM continued to operate multiplex and non-multiplex cinemas, but under its two different brand identities, with the multiplexes being known as MGM Cinemas and the smaller non-multiplexes remaining as Cannon. MGM opened new multiplexes in towns and cities already served by their Cannon cinemas, and then closed the Cannon cinemas "due to the competition from the new multiplex" – examples of this happened in Northampton and Swindon.

MGM Cinemas subsequently changed hands many times, first becoming Virgin Cinemas. Virgin Cinemas was founded in 1995 when Richard Branson's Virgin Group acquired MGM Cinemas; Virgin Group bought the cinemas (numbering 116 at the time) for £195m, and subsequently sold 90 of the chain's remaining non-multiplex cinemas to Cinven for £70m to concentrate on multiplexes.

Virgin then divested itself of the cinema business to French-owned UGC in 1999. Subsequently, UGC divested its UK operations to a rival operator, Cineworld in 2004.

While this was happening, the divested smaller ABC cinemas gained a stablemate under Cinven; in 2000 Cinven bought over the one-time rival chain of Odeon Cinemas for £280 million from Rank Group plc and most of the 60 remaining ABC Cinemas, which were mostly older, town centre cinemas, were rebranded as Odeon or were closed as the chain was now being run by the former Rank/Odeon executives. An exception was the venue at Westover Road, Bournemouth venue which retained the ABC brand until its closure in early 2017. The Odeon on the same road closed later that year. In 2004, the Odeon chain was sold to Terra Firma Capital Partners who had recently purchased UCI cinemas and over the next six years all the Rank people were replaced with UCI management, replicating what Odeon did to ABC in 2001/2002.

On Glasgow's Sauchiehall Street the O2 ABC Glasgow became a music venue until its permanent closure after it was severely damaged by a fire in 2018. Furthermore, Minehead and Skegness Butlins holiday camps had an on-site ABC cinema until the camp decided to close them in 2021.
