= Kirkgate (Wakefield) =

Street in Wakefield, West Yorkshire, England

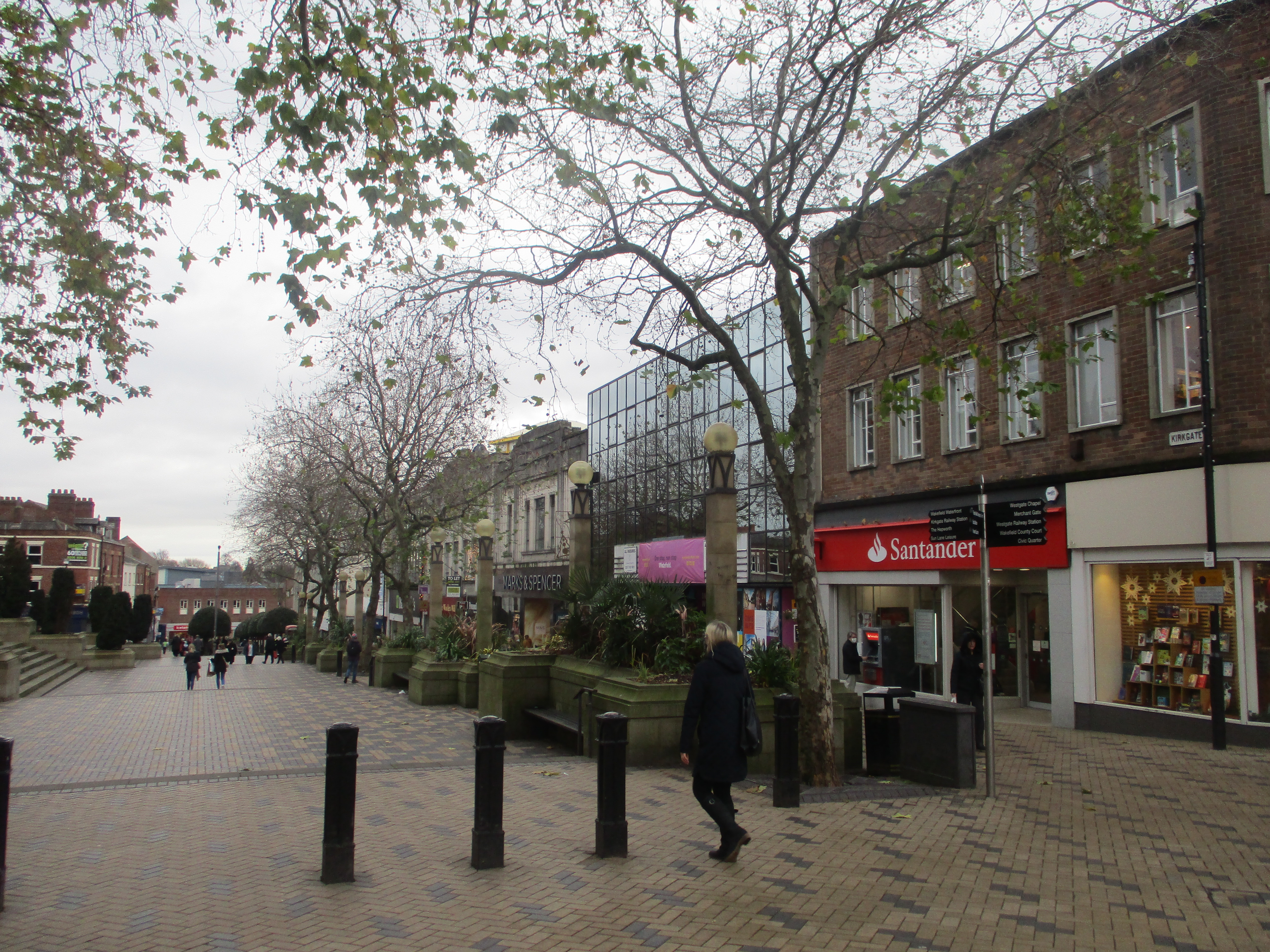
View east on the pedestrianised part of the street, in 2020

Kirkgate is a street in the city centre of Wakefield, in West Yorkshire, in England.

== History ==
While some sources claim that Kirkgate follows the line of a Roman road, there is no historic or archaeological evidence of this. It appears to date from the Saxon period, when it linked the centre of the settlement of Wakefield to a wooden bridge over the River Calder. This was replaced by the current Chantry Bridge in the 1340s. During the Mediaeval period, Kirkgate was at the centre of one of three quarters of the town. A gatehouse was constructed across the street, by the location of the present William Street. The part of the street near the town became built up, with houses on burgage plots. The Six Chimneys, a large timber-framed house, survived until 1941, when it collapsed.

By the 19th century, large houses lined much of the street, with courts behind, with smaller houses. The town's first railway station, Wakefield Kirkgate, opened on the east side of the street in 1840, with the line continuing over a three-arch viaduct over the road. This was replaced by the current single-arch bridge in 1900. In the 20th century, two large cinemas were constructed on the street: the Empire Theatre and the ABC Cinema.

In the early 21st century, parts of the street had become run-down. Wakefield Council launched the Kirkgate Innovative Neighbourhood Gateway, to demolish empty commercial properties, and create new housing and public spaces on the street.

== Layout and architecture ==
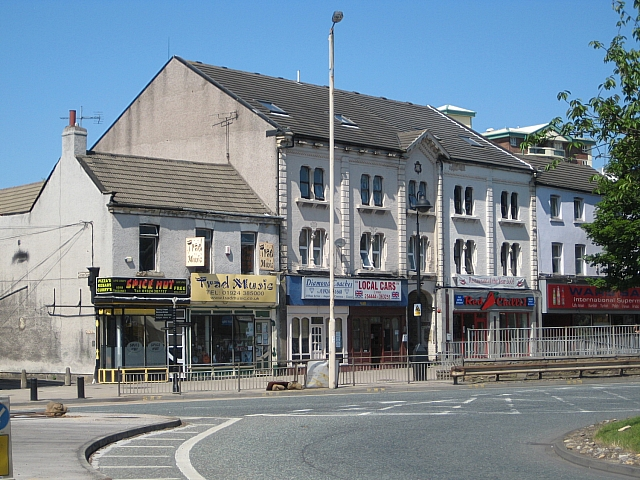
Buildings by the roundabout, in 2009

The street starts at a junction with Westgate and Northgate. The street is initially pedestrianised and runs east, with junctions with Teall Street on its north side, and Cathedral Walk and Almshouse Lane on its south side. It turns south-east at a junction with Lower Warrengate, with a junction with Sun Lane on its north-east side, and with George Street on its south-west side. It then crosses a large roundabout, where it meets Marsh Way and Peterson Road, then continues as the dual carriageway A61 road. This section has junctions with Brunswick Street and Park Street on its north-east side, and with Avison Yard, Dixons Yard, Wilds Yard, Charlotte Street, Grove Road, and Ings Road, on its south-west side. Finally, it passes under the railway bridge, running to Wakefield Bridge across the River Calder, next to Chantry Bridge. This section meets Calder Vale Road on the north-east side, and Thornes Lane on the south-west side.

The most notable building on the street is Wakefield Cathedral. Three other listed buildings lie on its south-west side: 11 and 13 Kirkgate, dating from about 1800; 17 Kirkgate, from the mid-19th century; and the late-18th century 19 and 21 Kirkgate. Also on this side of the street is The Ridings Centre. The West Yorkshire History Centre lies on its north-east side.
