= ABC Cinema, Wakefield =

Coordinates: 53°40′55″N 1°29′35″W

- Regal (1935–62), Cannon (1986–97)
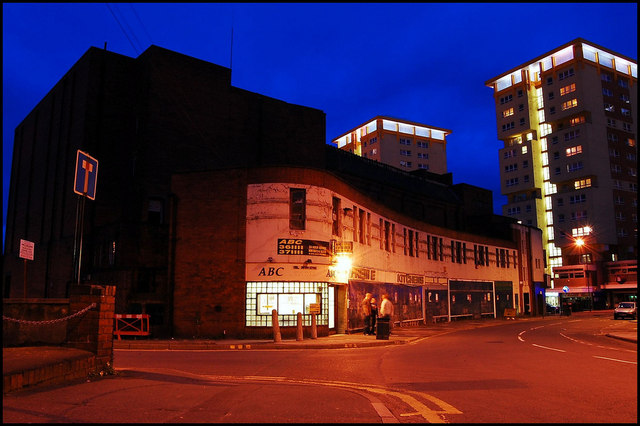
- The disused cinema at night
- Interactive map of ABC Cinema, Wakefield
- Address: Kirkgate; Wakefield, West Yorkshire; England
- Owner: ABC Cinemas (1935–86); The Cannon Group (1986–)
- Capacity: 1,594 (as a single-screen auditorium, 1935–76)
- Current use: Demolished

Construction
- Opened: 9 December 1935
- Closed: 1997
- Demolished: 2023
- Rebuilt: 1976 divided into a 3-screen complex
- Architect: William R. Glen

The ABC Cinema was a cinema in Wakefield, West Yorkshire that fell into dereliction after its closure. Located in Kirkgate on the corner of Sun Lane, it was designed and built in the Art Deco style for Associated British Cinemas by in-house architect William R. Glen and opened as the Regal Cinema on 9 December 1935.

Smaller than many later ABC houses, the Regal seated 1,594 people and had a full stage 26 feet (7.9 m) deep behind the 43 feet (13 m) wide proscenium. The interior was rather plainer than many of Glen's cinemas with concealed lighting under the balcony and at the rear of the ceiling and pendant fittings casting light upwards towards the front of the cinema. Although provision was made for an organ with chambers to the side and above the proscenium, one was never installed.

It was renamed ABC in 1962. In 1976 it was divided into three screens with Screen 1 seating 532 in the balcony using the original screen and projection suite and Screen 2 (236 seats) and Screen 3 (170 seats) in the rear stalls area. In this form it reopened on 11 November 1976. In 1986, ABC's cinemas were sold to The Cannon Group. In December 1996, Cineworld opened a multiplex in Wakefield, and in 1997, the ABC closed.

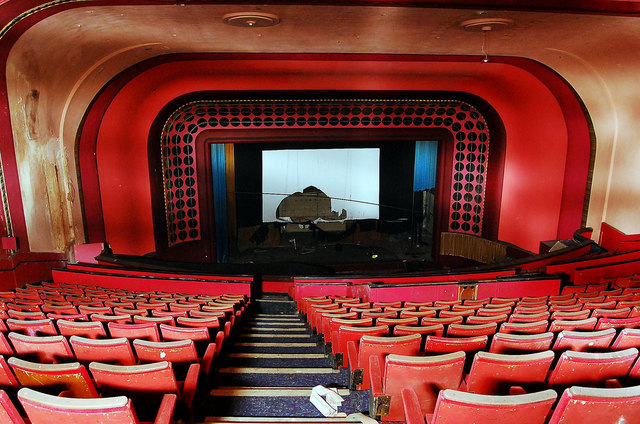
View from the circle to the screen and stage (Screen 1 since 1976)

In 2007, Blockbuster Entertainment sought planning permission to convert the building into 119 one- and two-bedroom flats, eight shops and a rooftop garden. In 2009, the City of Wakefield granted planning permission, but the project did not go ahead. In December 2013, a property company, PS & S Ltd, applied for planning permission to demolish the building and replace it with a modern apartment block. Plans to demolish the building and replace it with a car park were withdrawn in 2019. In 2020 the site was bought by Wakefield Council which announced plans in June 2021 to demolish the cinema and turn the site into a temporary green space until a new building is designed. Demolition began internally in March 2022, and exterior demolition was completed in May 2023.

The Beatles played at the Cinema on Thursday 7 February 1963 as part of the Helen Shapiro Winter Tour, just a few days before they recorded on 11 February, the majority of their first album, Please Please Me. The Beatles had only released one single at this stage – Love Me Do, which had reached number 17 in the charts. The Cinema played host to many such shows in the 1950s and 1960s.
