= Jonathan Bielby =

English cathedral organist and composer

Jonathan Leonard Bielby MBE (born 23 November 1944) is an English cathedral organist and composer of organ music. In 2010 he retired from Wakefield Cathedral after an exceptionally long incumbency, which had lasted more than forty years.

== Life ==
Son of Leonard Bielby, of Old Woodstock, Oxfordshire, and Helen Joyce, daughter of Rev. Percy John Grubb, a Methodist minister at Knutsford and Haworth in Yorkshire, from an Irish gentry family, Bielby was educated at Magdalen College School, Oxford, where he studied under Bernard Rose, and at St John's College, Cambridge (BA 1966, MusB 1967, MA 1970), where between 1963 and 1967 his musical activities included a stint as the organ scholar, under the musical direction of George Guest.

Having served as assistant organist at Manchester Cathedral from 1966 to 1970, Bielby took up his post as organist and director of music at Wakefield in 1970. Bielby oversaw the rebuilding of the Willis organ in Huddersfield Town Hall and of the massive Compton organ in Wakefield Cathedral itself. He was also the first borough organist of Kirklees, West Yorkshire from 1974 to 1988, during which time he gave recitals at Huddersfield Town Hall and elsewhere. Bielby was a senior lecturer at the City of Leeds College of Music from 1979.

Bielby has composed a significant body of church and organ music, including "Love's Endeavour, Love's Expense" and "Let the roring organs loudly play".

== Awards and honours ==
In 2011 he was appointed MBE.
