= West Yorkshire History Centre =

Coordinates: 53.6796°N 1.4916°W

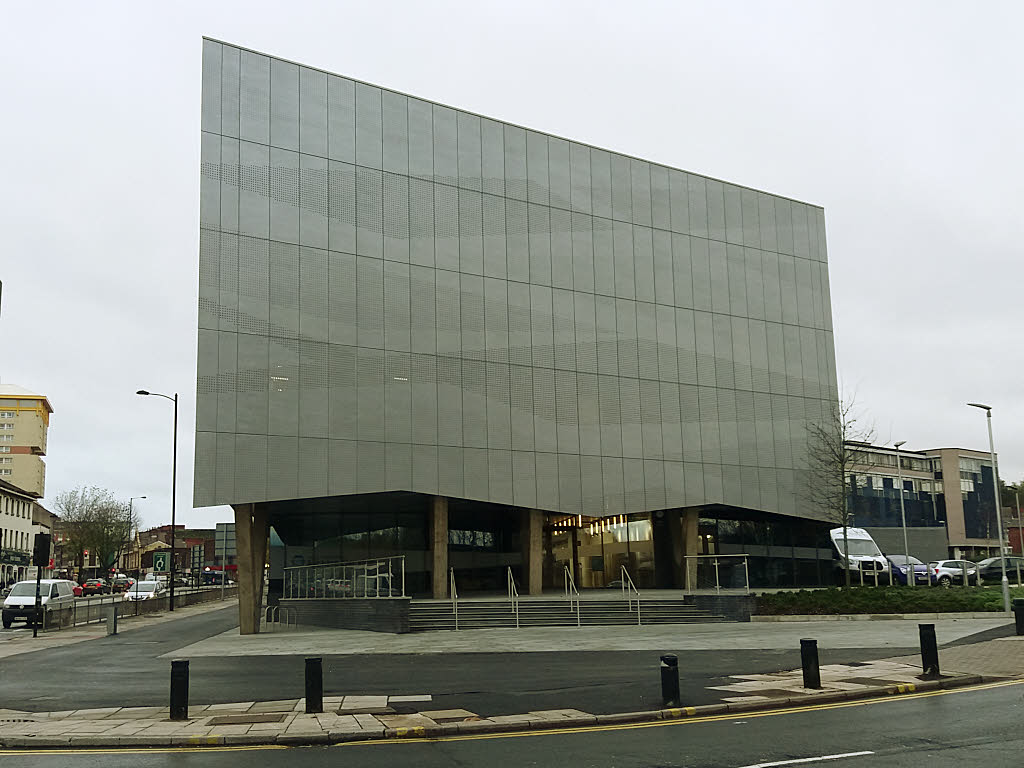
The building in 2016

The West Yorkshire History Centre is an archive in Wakefield, in West Yorkshire, in England.

The centre evolved from the West Riding Registry of Deeds, opened on Kirkgate in Wakefield in 1704. This was the first such registry in England. In 1932, the records were transferred to a new building on Newstead Road in the city, later becoming the West Yorkshire Archive Service. It moved to its current building, back on Kirkgate, in 2016, by which time it held more than 10 million records. It is run by West Yorkshire Joint Services.

In addition to the 7 million deeds, the centre holds surviving records of the West Riding of Yorkshire, from 1194 onwards, the National Coal Board collection of records relating to the local area, and the records of Stanley Royd Hospital.

The building was designed by Broadway Malyan. It includes a local history centre on the ground floor, and the archives on the upper floors. These are surrounded by a metal mesh wrap, which is lit with changing colours in the evenings.
