= Thomas Christy =

English organist and Anglican priest

Revd. Thomas Christy ARCO (7 October 1905 – 1976) was an organist and Priest in the Church of England based in England.

== Life ==
He was born in 1905 in South Shields, the son of Thomas Christy and Mary. He was educated at King's College, Durham from 1926 to 1929.

He was an organist for several years before ordination. He studied for the priesthood at Queen's College, Edgbaston, from 1946 to 1947. He was made deacon in 1947 and priest in 1948.

== Appointments ==
- Assistant Organist of Newcastle Cathedral 1928–1933
- Organist of Hexham Abbey 1933–1945
- Curate at St Paul's Church, Whitley Bay 1947–1951
- Rector of Alyth and Meigle 1951–1953
- Vicar of St. Paul's Church, Alnwick 1953–1959
- Rector of Creiff 1960–1963
- Rector of Newton-in-the-Isle, Cambridgeshire 1963–unknown

== Compositions ==
His compositions include compositions for choir and organ.
