= Ronald Richardson Potter =

Scottish organist and composer

Ronald Richardson Potter MA ARCO (12 July 1879 - 4 May 1911) was a Scottish organist and composer based in England.

== Life ==
He was born on 12 July 1879 in Bothwell, Lanarkshire, the son of John Alexander Potter and Christina Gladstone Richardson. He studied at Oxford University and graduated in 1902.

He died at the young age of 31 on 4 May 1911 whilst in office as organist of Hexham Abbey.

== Appointments ==
- Organist of Hexham Abbey 1909 - 1911

== Compositions ==
His compositions include compositions for choir and organ.
