= Tidfrith of Hexham =

9th-century Bishop of Hexham

Tidfrith
- Bishop of Hexham
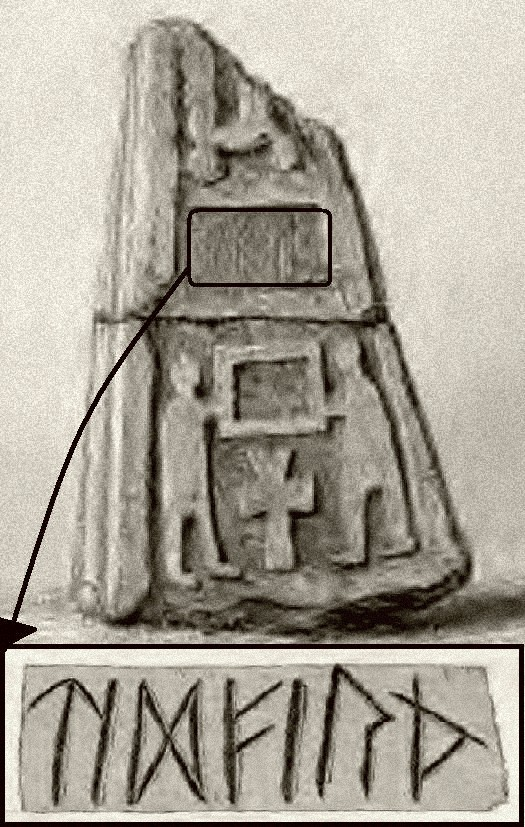
- Engraving of the cross-slab and runic inscription
- Appointed: c. 813
- Term ended: 821
- Predecessor: Eanberht
- Successor: unknown, probably none

Orders
- Consecration: c. 813

Personal details
- Born: unknown unknown
- Died: c. 821 x 822

Tidfrith or Tidferth was an early 9th-century Northumbrian prelate. Said to have died on his way to Rome, he is the last known Anglo-Saxon bishop of Hexham. This bishopric, like the bishopric of Whithorn, probably ceased to exist, and was probably taken over by the authority of the bishopric of Lindisfarne. A runic inscription on a standing cross found in the cemetery of the church of Monkwearmouth is thought to bear his name.

== Dates ==
The dates of his episcopate are unclear, but Richard of Hexham says that he died 54 years before the great Scandinavian invasion in 875, a claim which if specifically true would mean his episcopate was over by either 821 or 822.

It is uncertain when he was born or when he gained office. Surviving lists of Hexham bishops give Tidfrith's predecessors Heardred and Eanberht three years and thirteen years respectively. As Heardred's consecration as bishop can be synchronised with the Anglo-Saxon Chronicle entry for 797—assuming both sources to be accurate on the point—Tidfrith became bishop c. 813. However, the date is also sometimes given as 806.

According to a tradition preserved in Richard of Hexham, Tidfrith died on his way to Rome. There is an engraved stone, discovered in the 19th century in the cemetery of Wearmouth, which has the name "Tidfrith" in runic characters; it may be in reference to the bishop, as Wearmouth was in the diocese. Historian James Raine suggested that his death may have occurred there, waiting to take a ship from the mouth of the river Wear.

== Disappearance of Hexham bishopric ==
It is unclear what became of the bishopric of Hexham after Tidfrith's episcopate, one suggestion being that it was absorbed by the bishopric of Lindisfarne. Another explanation is that given by William of Malmesbury in his Gesta Pontificum Anglorum, namely that

The army of the Danes, feared since the days of Alcuin, came to our land. They killed or put to flight the people from Hexham, set fire to the roofs of their dwellings and exposed their private rooms to the skies.

Modern historian, David Rollason, wrote that Hexham's disappearance was "unlikely to have had anything to do with Viking activity". Despite what William of Malmesbury wrote, Hexham's demise is "utterly obscure". Another Northumbrian diocese, that based at Whithorn, disappeared in the same era, meaning that the Northumbrian church went from having 5 bishoprics at its height (Lindisfarne, Hexham, Whithorn, Abercorn and York) to only two.

Hexham was however, along with Lindisfarne and Carlisle, sacked by Scandinavians in 875. In the later 9th-century the Lindisfarne diocese was able to relocate to Chester-le-Street, a site that lay within the old diocese of Hexham. The community of St Cuthbert were able to take possession of Hexham and its churches, and Hexham remained in the possession of the community of St Cuthbert until it was granted away by Bishop Walcher to Prior Aldwin in 1075.

== Citations ==
Christian titles
Preceded by Eanberht	Bishop of Hexham c. 813–c. 821 x 822	unknown
