= Æthelberht of Whithorn =

8th-century Bishop of Hexham and Bishop of Whithorn

- Bishop of Hexham
- Diocese: Diocese of Hexham (ancient)
- In office: c. 790 – 797 (death)
- Predecessor: Tilbeorht
- Successor: Heardred
- Other post: Bishop of Whithorn (776 or 767 – c. 790)

Orders
- Consecration: 15 June, in 776 or 777

Personal details
- Died: 16 October 797
- Denomination: Catholic

Æthelberht (Old English: Æðelberht; died 797) was an 8th-century Anglo-Saxon bishop. His consecration as Bishop of Whithorn can be placed using the Anglo-Saxon Chronicle on 15 June in either 776 or 777, and took place at York. In 789, 790 or 791 he became Bishop of Hexham; he was succeeded at Whithorn by Beadwulf. He died on 16 October 797. He is known to have corresponded with Alcuin.

== Citations ==
Christian titles
Preceded by Pehtwine	Bishop of Whithorn; 776 × 767 – 789 × 791	Succeeded by Beadwulf
Preceded by Tilberht	Bishop of Hexham; 789 × 791 – 797	Succeeded by Heardred
