= Alfred Southcott Morrish =

British organist and composer (1906–1978)

Alfred Southcott Morrish FRCO (13 December 1906 – 1978) was an organist and composer based in England.

== Life ==
He was born in 1906 in Aldershot, Hampshire. He studied organ at Exeter Cathedral under Dr. Thomas Armstrong and Dr. Alfred William Wilcock. He was awarded his FRCO in 1936.

From 1934 he was organist at the Cadbury Deanery Choral Festivals.

He married Mary Taylor.

He died in 1978.

== Appointments ==
- Organist of St Paul's Church, Devonport 1925–1932
- Assistant Organist of Crediton Parish Church 1932–1937
- Organist of Sandford Parish Church 1934–1937
- Organist of St James' Church, Teignmouth 1937–1945
- Organist of Hexham Abbey 1945–1948
- Organist of All Souls' Church, Hastings 1950 - ????
- Organist of St Ethelburga's Church, St Leonards on Sea 1964 - ????

== Compositions ==
His compositions include compositions for choir and organ and a string quartet in F.
