= Acca of Hexham =

8th-century Bishop of Hexham

Saint Acca of Hexham

Abbot & Bishop
- Born: c. 660
- Died: 740 or 742
- Venerated in: Catholic Church, Anglicanism
- Major shrine: Hexham Abbey, Northumberland (part of his cross survives)
- Feast: 20 October

Acca of Hexham (c. 660 – 740/742) was an early medieval Northumbrian prelate, serving as bishop of Hexham from 709 until 732, and subsequently commemorated as a Christian saint.

== Life ==
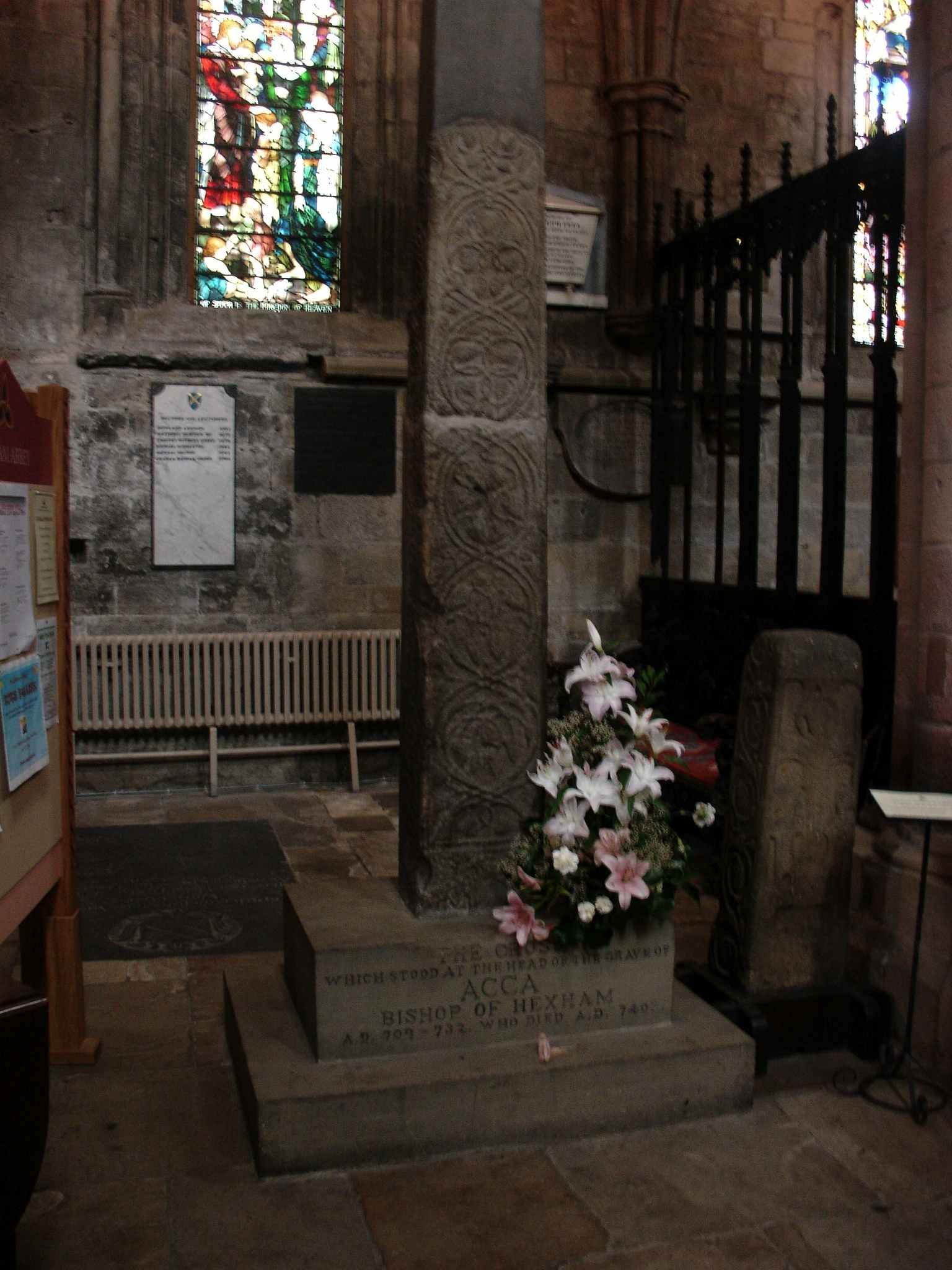
Remnant of cross that stood at Acca's grave, Hexham Abbey

Born in Northumbria, Acca first served in the household of Bosa, the future Bishop of York, but later attached himself to Wilfrid, possibly as early as 678, and accompanied him on his travels.

Later he told his friend Bede of their stay at Utrecht with the archbishop Willibrord, Wilfrid's old pupil who was carrying on his work of converting continental heathens. On the return from their second journey to Rome in 692, Wilfrid was reinstated at Hexham and made Acca abbot of St Andrew's monastery there. During Wilfrid's later years, Acca was the older man's loyal companion, eventually succeeding him in 709 as abbot and bishop.

Acca tackled his duties with much energy, in ruling the diocese and in conducting the services of the church. He also carried on the work of church building and decorating started by Wilfrid. Acca was both an accomplished musician and a learned theologian. Bede describes Acca as "...a most experienced cantor, most learned in sacred writings, ...and thoroughly familiar with the rules of ecclesiastical custom."

Acca once brought to the North a famous cantor named Maban, who had learned in Kent the Roman traditions of psalmody handed down from Gregory the Great through Augustine of Canterbury.

Acca was also famous for his theological learning; his theological library was praised by Bede as "'large and most noble". He was known also for his encouragement of students by every means in his power. It was Acca who persuaded Stephen of Ripon (Eddius) to take on the Life of Saint Wilfrid, and he lent many materials for the Historia ecclesiastica gentis Anglorum to Bede, who dedicated several of his most important works, especially those dealing with Holy Scripture, to him.

For reasons now unknown, Acca either withdrew, or was driven from, his diocese in 732. Hexham tradition says he became bishop of Whithorn in Galloway, Scotland, while others claim he founded a see on the site of St Andrews, bringing with him relics collected on his Roman tour, including those of St Andrew. Yet a third account states that having fallen out with the Northumbrian king, Acca went to live in exile in Ireland on a remote coast before returning to Hexham. St Andrew's Church in Aycliffe is said to have been once dedicated to Acca.

Acca was buried at Hexham near the east wall of the abbey. Two finely carved crosses, fragments of one of which still remain, were erected at the head and foot of his grave. He was revered as a saint immediately after his death. His body was translated at least three times: in the early 11th century, by Alfred of Westow, sacrist of Durham; in 1154, at the restoration of the church, when the relics of all the Hexham saints were put together in a single shrine; and again in 1240. His feast day is 20 October. The translation of his relics is commemorated on 19 February.

The only surviving writing of Acca's is a letter addressed to Bede and printed in his works (see also Raine below).

== Citations ==
Christian titles
Preceded by Wilfrid	Bishop of Hexham; 709–732	Succeeded by Frithubeorht
