= West Yorkshire Joint Services =

Provider of public services in England

West Yorkshire Joint Services (WYJS) provides a range of public services to the five districts of West Yorkshire, England (Bradford, Calderdale, Kirklees, Leeds and Wakefield). It is jointly funded by the five district councils, pro rata to their population, and is run by a committee of equal numbers of councillors from the five councils. It "brings together a number of key services which the five district councils of West Yorkshire recognise can be more effectively delivered on a county-wide basis".

When West Yorkshire Metropolitan County Council was abolished in 1986, a "Joint Committee Arrangement" was established, to continue to provide archaeology, archives and trading standards services for the five successor district councils. In 1997 the Joint Services were created, to avoid duplication of resources across these services; it is based near Morley, Leeds.

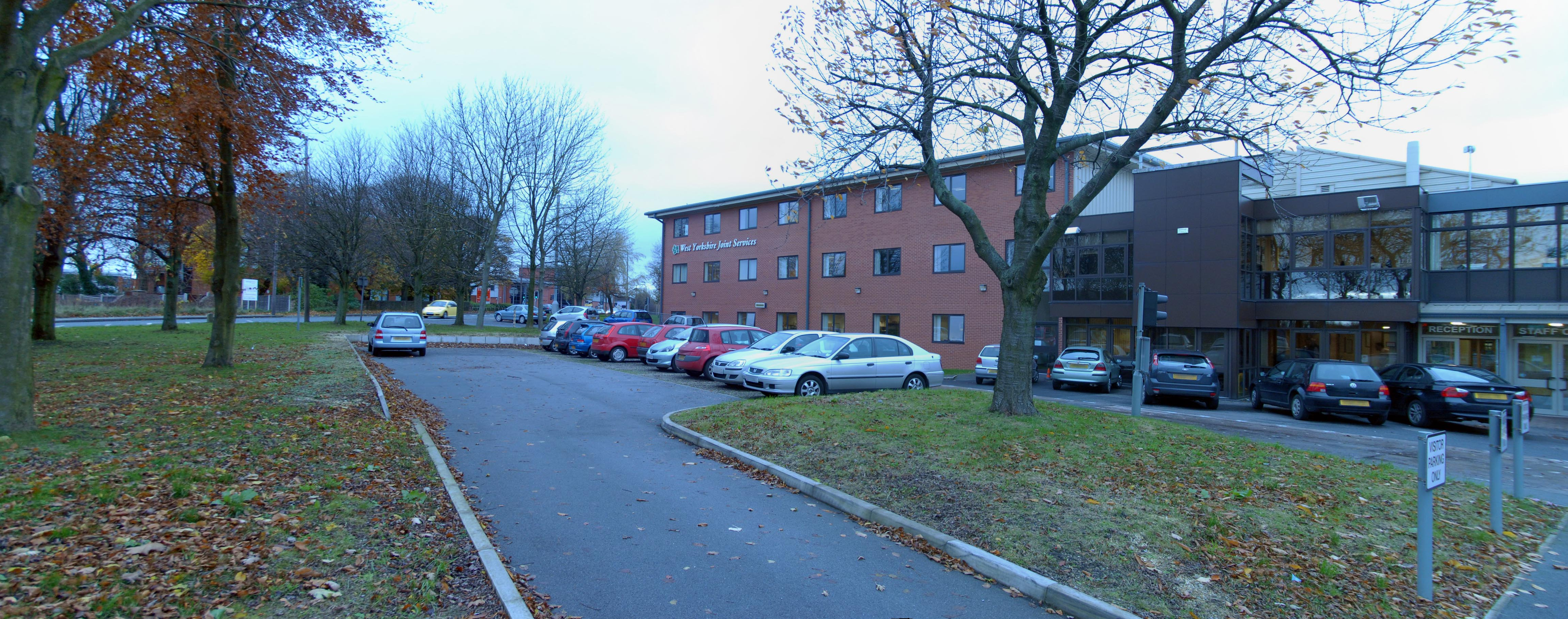
West Yorkshire Joint Services Building in Morley

Joint Services comprises:

- West Yorkshire Archaeology Advisory Service
- Archaeological Services WYAS, a commercial organisation
- West Yorkshire Archive Service
- West Yorkshire Ecology
- West Yorkshire Materials Testing Service
- West Yorkshire Analytical Services
- West Yorkshire Trading Standards
- West Yorkshire Calibration Services

== Archive Service ==
The archive service operates at five locations: at the West Yorkshire Joint Service's Headquarters in Morley, Leeds; at the West Yorkshire History Centre in Wakefield (incorporating the West Riding Registry of Deeds); Bradford Central Library; Halifax Central Library in Calderdale and Huddersfield Central Library in Kirklees.
