= Eanberht of Hexham =

9th-century Bishop of Hexham

Eanbeorht
- Bishop of Hexham
- In office: 800
- Predecessor: Heardred
- Successor: Tidfrith

Orders
- Consecration: 800

Personal details
- Died: 813
- Denomination: Christian

Eanbeorht (or Eanberht) was a medieval Bishop of Hexham who was consecrated in 800 and died in 813.

== Citations ==
Christian titles
Preceded by Heardred	Bishop of Hexham; 800–813	Succeeded by Tidfrith
