= Edwin Savage =

British Anglican priest (1862-1947)

Edwin Sidney Savage (28 February 1862 — 26 October 1947) was a British priest in the Church of England and an author.

Born in Port Elizabeth South Africa, Savage was educated at New College, Eastbourne, University College London and Magdalen College, Oxford.

Savage married Jane McEwan, who died on 23 November 1886 following the birth of their only child, Ronald McEwan Hill Savage. He married secondly, in 1889, Sibil Farrar, daughter of Frederic Farrar, Dean of Canterbury (1895-1903); they had a son (Lieutenant Cuthbert Savage, killed in action during World War I) and four daughters (Enid, Audrey, Rosella and Elflida).

Savage was the Rector of Hexham from 1898 to 1919, during which time he oversaw the abbey's rebuilding.

After serving with 21 ships during the First World War as Chief Commissioner of YMCA in the Mediterranean, Savage was decorated with the Serbian Red Cross Order for services in relief of its civilian population. He also received the Order of St Sava as well as the honorary military rank of major from King Peter I of Serbs, Croats and Slovenes. He was also honoured with the Serbian Orthodox Church's Golden Cross, whose insignia of a large pectoral cross in repousse gold he later often wore. He also served on the International Commission to report on the Bulgarian Atrocities.

On the evening of 26 October 1947, Savage was found dead in a smoke-filled room after raising the alarm for a fire in his sitting room at 18 London Road in Bexhill, a town he had been associated with for the previous 20 years. The coroner returned a verdict of accidental death but his cause of death remains in doubt as there was no evidence of burning.

Memorial to Savage in the nave of St Bartholomew the Great

Other achievements:

- Constructor of the Abbey Institute in Gilesgate Hexham, now home to the Hexham Community Centre
- Restorator and conservator of the Church of St Bartholomew the Great, Smithfield, during his term as rector (1929–1944)
- Honorary chaplain to the Worshipful Companies of Butchers and Makers of Playing Cards
- Honorary canon of Newcastle Cathedral

== Writings ==
- A Record of All Works Connected with Hexham Abbey since January 1899 and now in progress, J. Catherall, Hexham, (1907)
- Rahere Yesterday and Today & His Priory Church of St. Bartholomew: Its Chequered Story and An Appeal, London: Waterlow & Sons Limited, (circa 1930)
