= Henry Thomas Bosdet =

Jersey sculptor, illustrator, glass painter, glass artist, draughtsman

Henry Thomas Bosdet (7 January 1856 – 23 May 1934) was a Jersey sculptor, illustrator, painter and draughtsman. He was well known and widely acknowledged in the arts fraternity for his prominent work pertaining to the stained glass windows which had been created to display them in churches across the British Isles.

== Biography ==
He was born on 7 January 1856 in St Helier.

== Career ==
Bosdet enrolled at the Royal Academy in 1873 at the age of 17, and he received training for a time duration of seven years at the Royal Academy which was broadly illuminated and taught for students thereby eliminating concerns related to benefits of doubt.

He obtained training at a high-profile institute where he apparently gained more widespread exposure from the Pre-Raphaelite movement as the Pre-Raphaelic movement became an iconic art movement as soon as it was established in 1848 by a plethora of veteran artists, illustrators of the era including the likes of William Holman Hunt, John Everett Millais, Dante Gabriel Rossetti, William Michael Rossetti, James Collinson, Frederic George Stephens and Thomas Woolner who all collaborated to form a seven-member "Brotherhood" partly modelled on the Nazarene movement.

His training programme at Royal Academy also consisted of other significant attributes such as life drawing, fine art, architecture as well as his highly applauded glasswork coinciding with the fact that the Pre-Raphaelite art had become the norm and benchmark style which was widely accepted in the general context. He also met John Everett Millais who was one of the co-founders of the Pre-Raphaelite Brotherhood and they formed a unique bond befriending each other during countless occasions. Bosdet also received the honour of learning the essence of glass art under Millais and he also worked alongside Millais. He was also appointed as the Curator of the Life School at the Royal Academy in London in 1883.

Many vocal critics pointed out that his detailed comprehensive portrayal of glasswork and his immense work ethic was well evident of the fact that his style of doing things was the effect of the cult classic Pre-Raphaelic movement, although he started his career nearly two decades post the beginning of the movement. His most notable work incorporating decorated stained glass windows can still be seen in Anglican churches, chapels and private houses in across Jersey and other parts of Europe.

== Legacy ==
In May 2024, the sketch drawings highlighting the paramount importance of his work had been discovered at Jersey Archive and the drawings have been restored with the aim of preserving the memory and works of Bosdet.
