= Tilbeorht =

8th-century Bishop of Hexham

- Bishop of Hexham
- Appointed: before 2 October 781
- Term ended: 789
- Predecessor: Eahlmund
- Successor: Æthelbeorht

Orders
- Consecration: 2 October 781

Personal details
- Died: 789
- Denomination: Christian

Tilbeorht (or Tilberht) was a medieval Bishop of Hexham.

Tilbeorht was consecrated perhaps on 2 October in either 780 or 781. He died in 789.

== Citations ==
Christian titles
| Preceded by Eahlmund | Bishop of Hexham; 780 or 781–789 | Succeeded by Æthelbeorht |
