= Sussie Morrish =

Filipina–New Zealand marketing academic

Academic background
- Education: University of Canterbury
- Thesis: Portfolio entrepreneurs: pathways to growth and development (2008)
- Doctoral advisor: Robert T. Hamilton, Venkataraman Nilakant

Sussie Celna Morrish is a Filipina–New Zealand marketing academic, and is a full professor at the University of Canterbury, specialising in entrepreneurship, strategic marketing and the hospitality industry.

== Academic career ==
Morrish is originally from the Philippines. Morrish lectured at the University of Auckland from 2005 to 2009, whilst at the same time completing a PhD titled Portfolio entrepreneurs: pathways to growth and development at the University of Canterbury in 2008. Her thesis was supervised by Professor Bob Hamilton and Associate Professor Nilakant. Morrish then joined the faculty of the Department of Management, Marketing and Entrepreneurship at University of Canterbury, rising to full professor. Morrish teaches in the areas of strategic marketing and entrepreneurship.

Morrish is interested in entrepreneurship and the hospitality industry. She tracked numbers of hospitality businesses in Christchurch after the 2011 earthquakes, noting that cafes and restaurants had returned to pre-quake numbers within about three years, and that some businesses used the disruption as an opportunity to reposition themselves or their brand in the market. Morrish also researches food security and luxury consumption.

Morrish is an associate editor of the Journal of Strategic Marketing, the Journal of Macromarketing and the Journal of Research in Marketing and Entrepreneurship, and was guest editor of the second edition of Journal of Research in Marketing and Entrepreneurship in 2011. She also serves on the Advisory Board of the Global Research Conference on Marketing and Entrepreneurship.

== Selected works ==
- Elena Vasilchenko; Sussie Morrish (2011). "The Role of Entrepreneurial Networks in the Exploration and Exploitation of Internationalization Opportunities by Information and Communication Technology Firms". Journal of International Marketing. 19 (4): 88–105. doi:10.1509/jim.10.0134. Wikidata Q121953127.
- Sussie C. Morrish; Morgan P. Miles; Jonathan H. Deacon (2010). "Entrepreneurial marketing: acknowledging the entrepreneur and customer-centric interrelationship". Journal of Strategic Marketing. 18 (4): 303–316. doi:10.1080/09652541003768087. Wikidata Q58060635.
- Sussie C. Morrish (2011). "Entrepreneurial marketing: a strategy for the twenty‐first century?". Journal of Research in Marketing and Entrepreneurship. 13 (2): 110–119. doi:10.1108/14715201111176390. Wikidata Q121953105.
- Sussie C. Morrish; Rosalind Jones (2020). "Post-disaster business recovery: An entrepreneurial marketing perspective". Journal of Business Research. 113 (October 2017): 83–92. doi:10.1016/j.jbusres.2019.03.041. Wikidata Q113480837.
- S.C Morrish; R.T Hamilton (2002). "Airline alliances—who benefits?". Journal of Air Transport Management. 8 (6): 401–407. doi:10.1016/s0969-6997(02)00041-8. Wikidata Q121953159.
- Christina Kwai Choi Lee; Sussie C. Morrish (2012). "Cultural Values and Higher Education Choices: Chinese Families". Australasian Marketing Journal. 20 (1): 59–64. doi:10.1016/j.ausmj.2011.10.015. Wikidata Q121953050.
- C. David Shepherd; Gaia Marchisio; Sussie C. Morrish; Jonathan H. Deacon; Morgan P. Miles (2010). "Entrepreneurial burnout: exploring antecedents, dimensions and outcomes". Journal of Research in Marketing and Entrepreneurship. 12 (1): 71–79. doi:10.1108/14715201011060894. Wikidata Q58060633.
