= Frithubeorht =

8th-century Bishop of Hexham

Frithubeorht Frithbert
- Bishop of Hexham
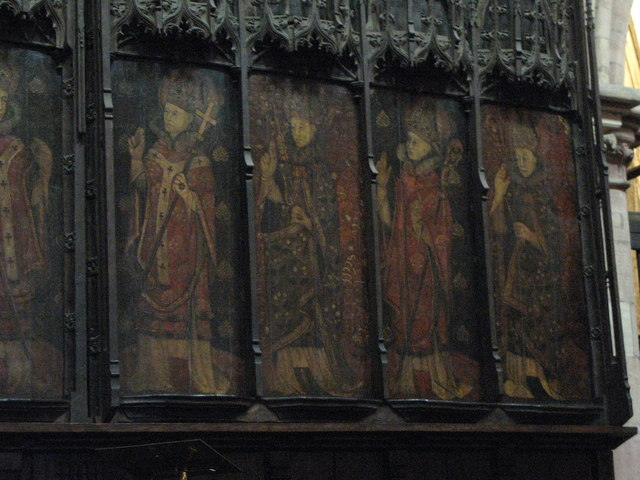
- The reredos at Hexham Abbey. Firthbert is shown second from the right.
- Appointed: before 8 September 734
- Term ended: 23 December 766
- Predecessor: Acca
- Successor: Eahlmund

Orders
- Consecration: 8 September 734

Personal details
- Died: 23 December 766
- Denomination: Christian

Frithubeorht (or Frithbert, Frithuberht, Latin: Frithubertus) (died 23 December AD 766) was an eighth-century medieval Bishop of Hexham.

There are several theories as to why Frithbert's predecessor Acca departed or was driven from the Diocese of Hexham in 732. According to one account, Acca had fallen out of favour with the Northumbrian king Ceolwulf because he had sided with Ceolwulf's opponents during an attempted coup. Frithubeorht, who was thought to be a strong supporter of the Northumbrian dynasty, was appointed in Acca's place as Bishop of Hexham. Frithubeorht was consecrated on 8 September 734 by Archbishop Ecgbert.

As the seventh Bishop of Hexham, Frithbert served as bishop for a lengthy thirty-four years until his death. In 750, when Cynewulf - the Bishop of Lindisfarne - was imprisoned, Frithbert also administered the church of Lindisfarne. He died on 23 December 766, the same year as Ecgbert. Bede praised Firthbert as a "truly faithful bishop." More recently, the historian John Godfrey, described Firthbert as an "undistinguished prelate."

Frithbert's relics were re-discovered at Hexham in 1154. He is considered a saint by both the Roman Catholic and the Eastern Orthodox Church.

== Citations ==
Christian titles
Preceded by Acca	Bishop of Hexham; 734–766	Succeeded by Eahlmund
