= Bishop of Hexham =

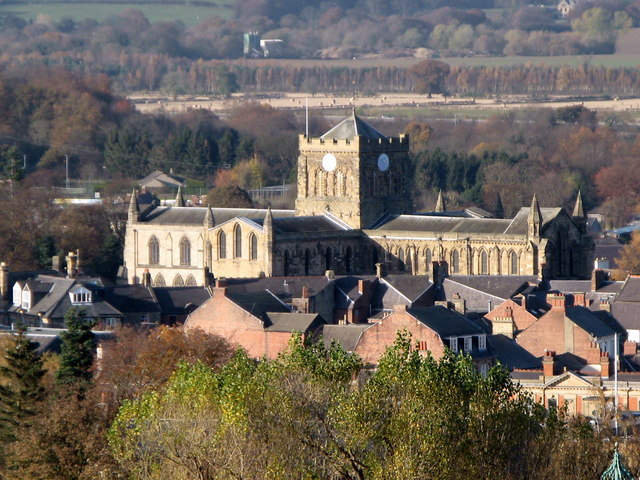
Hexham Abbey was founded in 674 AD, the present building dates mainly from about 1170–1250.

The Bishop of Hexham was an episcopal title which took its name after the market town of Hexham in Northumberland, England. The title was first used by the Anglo-Saxons in the 7th and 9th centuries, and then by the Roman Catholic Church since the 19th century.

== Anglo-Saxon bishops ==
The first Diocese of Lindisfarne was merged into the Diocese of York in 664. York diocese was then divided in 678 by Archbishop Theodore of Canterbury, forming a bishopric for the country between the Rivers Aln and Tees, with a seat at Hexham. This gradually and erratically merged back into the bishopric of Lindisfarne. Eleven bishops of Hexham followed St. Eata, of which six were saints.

No successor was appointed in 821, the condition of the country being too unsettled. A period of disorder followed the Danish devastations, after which Hexham monastery was reconstituted in 1113 as a priory of Austin Canons, which flourished until its dissolution under Henry VIII. Meantime the bishopric had been merged in that of Lindisfarne, which latter see was removed to Chester-le-Street in 883, and thence to Durham in 995.

Anglo-Saxon Bishops of Hexham
From	Until	Incumbent	Notes
678	c. 681	St. Eata	Translated to Lindisfarne circa 681.
681	684	Trumbert	Deposed in 684.
684	685	St. Cuthbert	Elected in 684. Translated to Lindisfarne in 685.
685	685 or 686	St. Eata (returned)	Died in office in 685 or 686.
687	706	St. John of Beverley	Became bishop in August 687. Translated to York in 706.
706	709	St. Wilfrid	Translated from Leicester in 706. Died in office in 709.
709	731	St. Acca	Deprived or expelled in 731. Died on 20 October 737 or 740.
734	766	St. Frithubeorht	Became bishop on 8 September 734. Died in office on 766.
767	780 or 781	St. Eahlmund	Became bishop on 24 April 767. Died in office on 7 September 780 or 781.
780 or 781	789	Tilbeorht	Became bishop on 2 October, possibly in 780 or 781. Died in office in 789.
789	797	Æthelberht	Translated from Whithorn in 789. Died in office on 16 October 797.
797	800	Heardred	Became bishop on 29 October 797. Died in office in 800.
800	813	Eanbehrt	Died in office in 813.
813	821	Tidfrith	Died in office in 821.
After the death of the last bishop of Hexham and a period of unrest, the see merged to the bishopric of Lindisfarne.

== Bibliography ==
- Fryde, E. B.; Greenway, D. E.; Porter, S.; Roy, I., eds. (1986). Handbook of British Chronology (3rd, reprinted 2003 ed.). Cambridge: Cambridge University Press. ISBN 0-521-56350-X.
- Brady, W. Maziere (1876). The Episcopal Succession in England, Scotland and Ireland, A.D. 1400 to 1875. Vol. 3. Rome: Tipografia Della Pace.
