= Heardred of Hexham =

8th-century Bishop of Hexham

Heardred
- Bishop of Hexham
- Appointed: before 30 October 797
- Term ended: 800
- Predecessor: Æthelbeorht
- Successor: Eanbeorht

Orders
- Consecration: 30 October 797

Personal details
- Died: 800
- Denomination: Christian

Heardred was a medieval Bishop of Hexham.

Heardred was consecrated on 30 October 797. He died in 800.

== Citations ==
Christian titles
Preceded by Æthelbeorht	Bishop of Hexham; 797–800	Succeeded by Eanbeorht
