= List of manuscripts in the Cotton library =

List of manuscripts from the Cotton library

This is an incomplete list of some of the manuscripts from the Cotton library that today form the Cotton collection of the British Library. Some manuscripts were destroyed or damaged in a fire at Ashburnham House in 1731, and a few are kept in other libraries and collections.

Robert Bruce Cotton organized his library in a room 26 feet (7.9 m) long by six feet wide filled with bookpresses, each with the bust of a figure from classical antiquity on top. Counterclockwise, these were Julius Caesar, Augustus, Cleopatra, Faustina, Tiberius, Caligula, Claudius, Nero, Galba, Otho, Vitellius, Vespasian, Titus, and Domitian. (Domitian had only one shelf, perhaps because it was over the door). In each press, each shelf was assigned a letter; manuscripts were identified by the bust over the press, the shelf letter, and the position of the manuscript (in Roman numerals) counting from the left side of the shelf. Thus, the Lindisfarne Gospels, Nero B.iv, was the fourth manuscript from the left on the second shelf (shelf B) of the press under the bust of Nero. For Domitian and Augustus, which had only one shelf each, the shelf letter was left out of the press-mark. The British Museum retained Cotton's press-marks when the Cotton collection became one of the foundational collections of its library, so manuscripts are still designated by library, bookpress, shelf, and number (even though they are no longer stored in that fashion). For example, the manuscript of Beowulf is designated Cotton MS Vitellius A.xv, and the manuscript of Pearl is Cotton MS Nero A.x.

== Augustus ==
i	Two large portfolios containing a 138 16th century maps, charts and plans of towns, buildings, fortifications and related items. Some of the items are plans for projects that were never completed.
ii	A portfolio containing a collection of 136 mostly Anglo-Saxon charters, also contains a few later medieval charters, Papal Bulls, and some other items. Includes: Item 3 The Ismere Diploma; Item 106 Magna Carta: Exemplification of 1215
iii	A collection of drawings, maps and diagrams from the reign of Henry VIII; prints belonging to or associated with the Speculum Romanae Magnificentiae
iv	Troy Book by John Lydgate, edition of 1555 with some variations. According to heraldic evidence the manuscript was created between 1411 and 1458, probably during Lydgate's lifetime.
v	Le Trésor des Histoires. Universal history, from the Creation to Pope Clement VI (died 1352). 15th century copy, lavishly illuminated.
vi	Le livre des propriétés des choses, translated from Latin to French by Jehan Corbechon under the patronage of Charles V of France. 14th century, illuminated.
vii	Cartulary of Lewes Priory, now catalogued as Cotton MS Vespasian F XV.

== Caligula ==
A.i	Religious miscellany
A.ii	Fos. 3–5, A Pistil of Susan (fragment), probably by Huchoun; fos. 5–13, Sir Eglamour of Artois; fos. 22–35, Octavian; fos. 35–42, Sir Launfal; fos. 42–57, Lybeaus Desconus; fos. 71–6, Emaré; fos. 130–4, Sir Isumbras.
A.iii	Texts on the Carthusians
A.iv	Annals of Eutychius, Patriarch of Alexandria. Text in Arabic.
A.v	Disputacion de la Felicite Humaine (1st quarter of the 16th century)
A.vi	Humphrey Llwyd, Chronicle of Welsh history, Cadwaladr ap Cadwallon (d. 664 × 682) to AD 1293; notes on the descent of Welsh nobles (1559)
A.vii	Heliand
A.viii	Miscellany: some hagiographies, and amongst others, the Libellus de Primo Saxonum vel Normannorum Adventu and Historia Brittonum (attributed to Nennius)
A.ix	The Owl and the Nightingale; Layamon, Brut
A.x	Peter of Ickham, De gestis Britonum et Anglorum, to AD 1289 (4th quarter of the 13th century); Chronicle of Worcester Cathedral Priory to 1377, religious miscellany
A.xi	Robert of Gloucester, Chronicle; Short Metrical Chronicle of England (imperfect) (2nd half of the 13th century); William Langland, The Vision of Piers Plowman (B version) (1st half of the 15th century), De uita monachorum (Mid 13th century)
A.xii	Annalistic chronicle, AM 1–AD 1246 (Mid 13th century); Cartulary of Pipewell Abbey (3rd quarter of the 13th century – 4th quarter of the 15th century)
A.xiii	List of the kings of England from Stephen (1135–1154) to Henry VII (1485–1509) (15th century); Chronicle of English history, AM 1–AD 1347 (4th quarter of the 14th century-1534); Cartulary of Pipewell Abbey (3rd quarter of the 13th century – 4th quarter of the 15th century)
A.xiv	Caligula Troper
A.xv	Jerome, De viris illustribus and Vita Sancti Pauli; extracts from Isidore of Seville, Etymologiae; extract from Cyprian, Ad Quirinum Testimonia, book iii; computistical texts; and Easter tables. (1) fos. 3-117, 8th and 9th-century material from France, which had arrived in England by the 9th or 10th century (2) fos. 120–53, once part of BL Egerton 3314, belonging to the 11th century. It consists of two parts: fos. 120–41, part A, computistical texts; annals of Christ Church, Canterbury; Old English and Latin prognostications and charms fos. 142–53, excerpts from Bede, De temporibus anni, with additional notes. At f. 123v is found a pagan Norse charm, invoking the god Thor.
A.xvi	Martinus Polonus, Chronicle (1st half of the 14th century-2nd half of the 15th century); Coluccio Salutati, Epistole (1st half of the 15th century)
A.xvii	Sermon on the murder of Elizabeth Dorrocott committed by William Dillon; report of the murder of Elizabeth Dorrocott, 24 May 1589, and the suicide of William Dillon
A.xviii	The Great Roll (Parliamentary Roll or Bannerets' Roll); hymn for the Blessed Virgin Mary; Ingratitude of the great; En un verger m’en entray; Une dame de mult grant pris (imperfect); The treason of Sir Thomas de Turberville; The Song of Caerlaverock (1st quarter of the 14th century)
B-E	Correspondence, records, and papers, including both originals and copies, concerning England, Scotland, and France. Largely 16th century. Includes letters from Mary, queen of Scots (B.iv, C.iii, C.vii), the correspondence of James VI, King of Scots (C.ix)

== Claudius ==
A.i	Religious miscellany
A.ii	Religious materials, much by John Mirk
A.iii	Volume of liturgical fragments
A.iv	Religious miscellany
A.v	Chronicon Angliae Petriburgense – The Spalding Annals
A.vi	Composite manuscript in two parts: the Latin cartulary of the Benedictine priory of St Mary and St Blaise at Boxgrove in the diocese of Chichester (13th and 14th centuries). The second part (first half of the 12th century) is sermons and letters by Ivo of Chartres, Marbodius, and Hildebert of Lavardin (13th century-14th century)
A.viii	Miscellany
A.x	Two works by John of Garland.
A.xi	Anselm of Canterbury, Epistole (2nd half of the 13th century-2nd half of the 14th century).
A.xii	Dudo of Saint-Quentin, Historia Normannorum; Marbod of Rennes, De Lapidibus; Bury St Edmunds hosteller's register; William de Montibus, Poeniteas Cito (3rd quarter of the 12th century-1450)
A.xiii	Cartulary of the Woodford family of Brentingby (Leicestershire), including a list of the kings of England to Henry VI (1449)
A.xiv	Jakob Nielsen (James Nicholas of Dacia), Liber de distinctione metrorum, written in commemoration of Aymer de Valence, 11th earl of Pembroke (d. 1324)
B.i	One of the two extant full-text translations of the Revelations of the mystic and saint Birgitta of Sweden, known as the Liber celestis revelationum (Heavenly Book of Revelations). The other is Cotton MS Julius F.ii
B.ii	Alan of Tewkesbury, Collectio Epistolarum Sancti Thome Cantuariensis; John of Salisbury, Life of St Thomas Becket with Alan of Tewkesbury's prologue. Alan of Tewkesbury (d. 1202) compiled a collection of St Thomas Becket's letters from earlier collections than John of Salisbury's collection. The earliest extant version of Alan of Tewkesbury's collection. It contains a number of emendations, additions and corrections indicating that it may have been a work in progress. Comprises 598 letters arranged in chronological order.
B.iii	Cartulary of York Minster, including terriers and rentals of the prebends (4th quarter of the 13th century-4th quarter of the 14th century)
B.iv	Illustrated Old English Hexateuch
B.v	Acts of the Council of Constantinople
B.vi	Cartulary of Abingdon Abbey (imperfect), including a treatise on the abbey's obedientiaries (1st half of the 13th century); Miniature of a battle-scene by the Boethius Master; Jean Froissart, Chronique (imperfect; 1st quarter of the 15th century)
B.vii	Manuscript assembled (from earlier materials) for Archbishop Matthew Parker (d. 1575). Includes legal proceedings; Roger of Howden, Chronicle, Pseudo-Turpin, De gestis Karoli magni; 'Prester John', Epistola ad Manuelem imperatorem, etc; extracts made in the time of Matthew Parker; Pseudo-Dares Phrygius, De excidio Troie historia; Geoffrey of Monmouth, Prophetiae Merlini; legal proceedings.
B.viii	Samaritan Pentateuch
B.ix	Hélinand of Froidmont, Chronicon, books i–xvi (only surviving volume of 3; mid 15th century); List of the martyrs, confessors and virgins buried at Christ Church Cathedral Priory, Canterbury; list of the confessors buried at St Augustine's Abbey, Canterbury; Family-tree of the Cistercian abbeys in England (Mid 13th century-2nd half of the 13th century); Historia uite et regni Ricardi secundi, AD 1377–1402 (1st quarter of the 15th century)
B.x	Carta de executoria de hidalguia made for Juan de la Torre de Valle of Gran Puerto de Santa Maria (1584)
C.i	Michael Heneage (d. 1600), Collections relating to English noble families, and names of the barons summoned by King Edward I of England to fight in Scotland, 1296
C.ii	Miscellany regarding English nobility, 16th-17th centuries
C.iii	The names and Armes of suche as haue ben aduaunced to the honorable Ordre of knighthoode, Henry IV–James I, mostly in the hand of Robert Glover (d. 1588), with an index (2nd half of the 16th century-1624)
C.iv	Extracts from the Red Book of the Exchequer and other records, including excerpts from the Strata Florida Chronicle and the Neath Chronicle (4th quarter of the 16th century)
C.v	Survey of Lindsey (1st quarter of the 12th century); Rental of Owston Abbey (4th quarter of the 14th century); Iohannes de Lignano, De uirtutibus generatione (imperfect) (Mid 15th century)
C.vi	Part 1 (2nd half of the 11th century, French), contains a collection of historical and legal works, predominantly the Decretum (Decretals) by Burchard, bishop of Worms. The second part (12th century) is from the Cathedral Priory of the Holy Trinity or Christ Church, Canterbury. It contains various documents related to Christ Church, and the Consuetudines (Constitutions) of Lanfranc, archbishop of Canterbury.
C.vii	Utrecht Psalter
C.viii	Index of the heirs of English families, Edward I–Elizabeth, extracted from various records, in the hand of Robert Glover (d. 1588).
C.ix	The first (2nd half of the 12th century) is the Chronicle of Hugh of Saint-Victor. The second (1st half of the 13th century), is the Gesta Regum Anglorum (Deeds of the Kings of England) by William of Malmesbury. The third part, (2nd half of the 12th century and late 13th century) is the Liber Terrarum (Book of the Lands) of the Benedictine abbey of the Blessed Virgin Mary, Abingdon, also known as the Historia Ecclesie Abbendonensis.
C.x	Names of those owing service to the kings of England, Henry III–Edward IV
C.xi	Registers of the bishopric of Ely.
C.xii	Inquisitions and escheats relating to Yorkshire, Henry III-Richard III, with genealogies of the descendants of Sir Robert Thwing of Danby (4th quarter of the 16th century-1st quarter of the 17th century).
D.i	Letters and documents related to the Abbey of St. Albans.
D.ii	Composition of Yards and Perches
D.iii	Bede, Martyrology; bilingual Rule of St Benedict; obituary calendar of Wintney Priory (c.1220 – 1st half of the 15th century).
D.iv	folios 48-54 of De Iniusta Vexacione Willelmi Episcopi Primi (missing introduction and parts of the conclusion)
D.vi	Abbreviatio compendiosa chronicorum Anglie (Brief Abridgement of the Chronicles of England), Matthew Paris's summary of his Historia Anglorum. The rest of the manuscript is mostly fragmented historical treatises composed by William Rishanger.
D.vi/1	In 1929, folio 12 of Claudius D.vi (including a map of Britain drawn by Matthew Paris) was removed and is now kept separately.
D.vii	Chronicle of Lanercost Priory
D.viii	Proctor's book of the University of Oxford (1st quarter of the 15th century); Commentary on the Gospels (imperfect) (Mid 15th century)
D.ix	The first part (2nd half of the 13th century) contains parts of papal and conciliar decretals. The second (1st quarter of the 12th century) contains the so-called Collectio Lanfranci (Lanfranc's Collection), a collection of decretals made in the 11th century and attributed to Lanfranc of Bec (b. 1005, d. 1089).
D.x	Cronica de regibus Anglie, Noah–AD 1377 (4th quarter of the 14th century); 'The Red Book' of St Augustine's (4th quarter of the 13th century-1st half of the 16th century)
D.xi	Cartulary of Malton Priory, including a pasted chirograph of Prior William of Ancaster (4th quarter of the 13th century-1534).
D.xii	Cartulary of Daventry Priory (4th quarter of the 13th century – 17th century).
D.xiii	Register of Binham Priory (3rd quarter of the 14th century – 17th century).
E.i	Theological tracts, including Anselm of Canterbury's treatises, Arnold of Bonneval's De Operibus Sex Dierum and De Sex Verbis Domini in Cruce; Peter the Chanter, Verbum Abbreviatum; Liber Esdrae
E.ii	Bible, in a version ascribed to John Wyclif (1st half of the 15th century)
E.iii	Ralph of Diceto, Abbreviationes Chronicorum, Ymagines Historiarum; Winchester Chronicle; Henry Knighton, Chronicon; William Rishanger, Opus Chronicorum; Tito Livio Frulovisi, Vita Henrici Quinti; Robert Grosseteste, Epistola
E.iv	Thomas Elmham, Chronica regum nobilium Anglie, to AD 1389 (imperfect); De inuentione et miraculorum sancti Amphibali sociorumque eius (incomplete, possibly added after Cotton's death) (1st half of the 17th century); materials related to the Abbey of St. Albans.
E.v	Notitia Provinciarum; Pseudo-Isidore, Decretales; excerpts from Bede, Historia Ecclesiastica Gentis Anglorum; Pseudo-Gregory the Great, Decreta; Cartulary of Christ Church, Canterbury; Ralph d'Escures, Letter (1st quarter of the 12th century)
E.vi	Leasebook of the Order of St John of Jerusalem (Knights Hospitallers), 1481, 1503–1526
E.vii	A Collection of all priuiledges, liberties & immunities whatsoeuer graunted to or claymed by the Merchants of the Hanze Citties with all differences & complaintes betweene the English & them concerning the same, Henry III–James I
E.viii	Adamus Murimuthensis, Chronicon Sui Temporis; Gerald of Wales, Topographia Hibernica and Expugnatio Hibernica

== Cleopatra ==
A.ii	Life of St Modwenna
A.iii	The Old English 'Cleopatra Glossaries'
A.xiv	Bernard Silvestris, Cosmographia; Cyfraith Hywel, Cyfnerth Redaction
A.xvi	Adamus Murimuthensis, Chronicon Sui Temporis
B.iii	Ailred of Rievaulx, Historia Angliae
B.ix	Miscellany
B.xiii	Miscellany (Homilies etc.)
C.viii	Prudentius, Conflict Of The Soul
D.i	Miscellany, including (1) Vitruvius, De architectura; (2) Vegetius, De Re Militari
D.v	Gerald of Wales, Topographia Hibernica and Expugnatio Hibernica. Made for Henry le Despenser, bishop of Norwich 1370-1406
E.vi	Miscellany, including Sir Thomas More's letter to Henry VIII before execution (ff. 176v–177)

== Domitian ==
i	Miscellany, includes Annales Cambriae C, works by Isidore of Seville, Bede, and Gerald of Wales. Provenance is St Davids Cathedral
ii	Miscellany: John Somer, Chronicle; computistical tables; Battle Chronicle; Liber de Situ Ecclesie Belli; an untitled Chronicle to AD 1292; Chronicles of the Brut; a summary of Anglo-Scottish affairs (4th quarter of the 12th century-2nd quarter of the 15th century)
iii	Chronicle from Brutus to AD 1299 (sometimes attributed to Peter of Ickham) (4th quarter of the 13th century-1st quarter of the 14th century); Cartulary of Leominster Priory (2nd quarter of the 13th century-1st half of the 16th century)
iv	Chronicles; Welsh verse; the Purgatory of St Patrick (13th to 15th century)
v	Ralph d’Escures, Epistola de iniuria sibi et ecclesie Cantuariensi illata and De primatu Cantuariensis ecclesie (3rd quarter of the 12th century); Gerald of Wales, De iure et statu Meneuensis ecclesie (imperfect) (1st half of 13th century); notes by Richard James (d. 1638) (1st half of the 17th century)
vi	John of Bologna, Summa notarie (incomplete); Aegidius de Fuscarariis, Ordo iudiciarius; Thomas of Capua, Summa de arte dictandi.
vii	Durham Liber Vitae
viii	Collection of chronicles. Includes: Item III (ff. 30–70) Bilingual Canterbury Epitome (Anglo-Saxon Chronicle F)
ix	fragment of the Bilingual Canterbury Epitome (Anglo-Saxon Chronicle H), futhorc row
x	Miscellany, including cartularies of Rochester Cathedral, chronicle summaries, and documents relating to English-Scottish relations.
xi	Miscellany of French documents, including much by Nicholas Bozon. Also a formulary relating to the abbey of Bec and its affairs in England (4th quarter of the 13th century-1st half of the 14th century)
xii	This manuscript is in three parts. The first is a chronicle from Brutus to AD 1335/6. The second part is another chronicle from Brutus to 1430, titled Cronica de Kirkstall (Chronicle of Kirkstall)--possibly written at the Cistercian Abbey of Kirkstall in Leeds. The third part contains sermons by Ivo of Chartres.
xiii	Miscellany
xiv	Chronicle of English and Norman affairs, AD 1035–1120 (imperfect) (4th quarter of the 13th century-1st quarter of the 14th century); Cartulary of Hyde Abbey (2nd half of the 13th century-15th century).
xv	Inquisition of the rights of the borough of Torksey; materials related to Ely.
xvi	The Psalter of Henry VI (c.1405-1430).
xvii	Treatises on English royal coronation and funeral rites; transcriptions of chronicles and other historical material, including maps by Laurence Nowell; Bernard André's Life of King Henry VII; treatises on heraldry (2nd half 15th century-1st quarter 17th century)

== Faustina ==
A.iii	Cartulary of the Abbey of St Peter, Westminster
A.v	Miscellany, separated by Henry Savile the Elder from Dublin, Trinity College 114. It includes the following items: fos. 25r–97r. Symeon of Durham, Liber de exordio atque procursu Dunelmensis ecclesiae, including Bede's Death Song fos. 99r–99v, Pseudo-Bede, De Quindecim Signis fos. 99v–102r, Pseudo-Augustine, De Antichristo quomodo et ubi nasci debeat
A.viii	Abbreviatio de Gestis Normannorum ad Gulielmum I Regem Angliae
A.x	Additional Glosses to the Glossary in Ælfric's Grammar
B.iii	Life of Saint Edith in Middle English Verse
B.viii	Register of Chapel of St Stephen, Westminster
B.ix	Chronicle of Melrose
C.iv	Gerald of Wales, Topographia Hibernica
D.i	Statutes of the Order of the Garter, revised under Edward VI

== Galba ==
A.ii	Anglo-Saxon futhorc, destroyed by fire
A.v	Irish Psalter
A.xviii	Athelstan Psalter, 10th century

== Julius ==
A.i	9 items damaged by fire in 1731. Consists of a drawing representing the origin of the Stywarde family arms (16th century); Chronicle of Bury St Edmunds, AM 1–AD 1265 (3rd quarter of the 13th century); Chronicle from the Creation to AD 1317 (1st half of the 14th century); Chronicle of the reigns of Kings Edward II (1307–27) and Edward III (1327–77) of England (imperfect; 1st half of the 14th century); Collection of English royal documents (1st half of the 14th century); Medieval memorandum (15th century); Cartulary of Pipewell Abbey (1st half of the 15th century-1st quarter of the 16th century); Genealogical tree of the kings of England (3rd quarter of the 13th century); Cartulary of Chatteris Abbey (second quarter of the 15th century, with additions to the 1st quarter of the 16th century; 17th century (186r))
A.ii	This manuscript contains 3 separate items, bound together for Cotton: Bede, De temporum ratione, books lxvi–lxx (imperfect), 1st quarter of the 12th century; Ælfric, Grammar (imperfect), Ælfric, Glossary; a grammatical treatise, beginning 'Sum verbum substantium', mid-11th century; A metrical prayer); Adrian and Ritheus; Disticha Catonis (excerpts), 2nd half of the 12th century. Damaged by fire in 1731.
A.iii	Bernard André, A la bonne grace du roy; Bernard André, Chancon faicte en l’honneur de madame Marie; Bernard André, Ad Henricum VII in vicesimum tercium felicissimi regni sui annalem (1507–08)
A.iv	Bernard André, Rerum memorandarum ad Henricum VII narratio (1504–05)
A.v	7 items, damaged by fire in 1731. Consists of Psalter leaves (c.1350–1360); Unidentified leaf (miniature of a king and his companions in a ship; 2nd half of the 13th century); Prophecy concerning Scotland (4th quarter of the 13th century – 1st quarter of the 14th century); Pierre de Langtoft, Chronicle of England, Brutus to AD 1306 (imperfect) and The Testament of the Buck (1st quarter of the 14th century – 3rd quarter of the 16th century); Unidentified leaf (miniature of Merlin taking leave of his mother; miniature of Merlin standing before Vortigern; 2nd half of the 13th century); Prophetie Merlini (Geoffrey of Monmouth, Historia regum Britannie, books 112–115) (imperfect; 4th quarter of the 13th century-1st quarter of the 14th century); and Pierre de Langtoft, Chronicle of England, AD 1307, Nicholas Bozon, Tretys de la Passion; Nicholas Bozon (attributed), Lament of the Virgin, The Prophecies of Merlin, Award of Norham, ballad on the Scottish wars, verse account of the Battle of Mansourah, 1250, Prose Lancelot (imperfect) (14th century).
A.vi	A calendar, computistical texts and tables, Expositio Hymnorum, canticles and poems (1st half of the 11th century – 2nd half of the 12th century)
A.vii	Chronicles of the Kings of Mann and the Isles, c. 1262; John of Salisbury, Entheticus in Policraticum; verse miscellanies; Revelatio sancti Michaelis in Monte Tumba, etc. This manuscript contains 9 items, bound for Cotton.
A.viii	3 items, damaged by fire in 1731: Leaf of a Psalter (2nd quarter of the 12th century); Thomas Otterburn, Chronica regum Anglie, Brutus to AD 1359 (mid 15th century – 1st quarter of the 17th century); Leaf of a Psalter (2nd quarter of the 12th century).
A.ix	5 items, damaged by fire in 1731: Leaf of a Bible (2nd half of the 13th century); De uita reclusorum, De reclusis, Guigo Carthusiensis (Ps.-Bernard of Clairvaux), Scala claustralium (imperfect); Commentary on the Carthusian statutes (1st half of the 16th century); Letter-book of Abingdon Abbey (2nd half of the 13th century); Leaf of a Bible (2nd half of the 13th century)
A.x	Old English Martyrology, (4th quarter of the 10th century-1st quarter of the 11th century); Life and Miracles of St Oswine (4th quarter of the 12th century-1st quarter of the 13th century)
A.xi	William Fitz Stephen's Life of St Thomas Becket (last quarter of the 12th century or 1st quarter of the 13th century; last quarter of the 13th century or 1st quarter of the 14th century); Aelred of Rievaulx, Gesta regum Anglorum, list of the kings of Britain and England (4th quarter of the 12th century-1st half of the 13th century); Serlo of Savigny, Uersus de contemptu mundi (4th quarter of the 12th century; imperfect); Leaf of a Book of Hours (c.1415–1420); Notes on William FitzStephen and Uita sancti Thome archiepiscopi et martyris (2nd half of the 17th century)
A.xvi	Ailred of Rievaulx, De Gestis Davidis Regis Scottorum
B.i	Leaf from a noted liturgical book (2nd half of the 15th century); Chronicle of the city of London, AD 1189–1483 (imperfect), including John Lydgate, 'Sotelties' at the Coronation Banquet of Henry VI, list of the lord mayors of London, 1509–31, battle-ordinances for the invasion of Scotland, 1386
B.ii	3 items: Chronicle of the city of London, AD 1189–1434/5, John Lydgate, On the entry of King Henry VI of England in London, 1432 (2nd quarter of the 15th century); Medieval endleaves, chronicle of the Popes to Gregory XI, chronicle of the Holy Roman emperors to Charles IV, chronicle of the archbishops of Canterbury to William Whittlesey, lists of bishoprics, chronicle of English history, Brutus–1367, medieval endleaf (2nd half of the 14th century-1st quarter of the 15th century).
B.iii	Leaf from a noted liturgical book (2nd half of the 15th century)
B.iv	Customs and liberties concerning the Cinque Ports, including original documents; Modus tenendi Parliamentum (1st quarter of the 17th century; middle of the 15th century; 2nd half of the 16th century)
B.v	Leaves from two noted liturgical books; Laws and customs of the port of Sandwich (2nd half of the 16th century)
B.vi	Papers (mostly originals) relating to Brittany, Edward III (1327–77)–Henry VII (1485–1509) (2nd half of the 14th century – 1st half of the 17th century). Leaves damaged by fire, 1731.
B.vii	3 items, endleaves damaged by fire in 1731: 2 imperfect penetentials from the 2nd half of the 13th century; Calendar. Ps.-Ambrose of Milan, De gradibus uirtutum (incomplete), Bede (attributed), Martyrologium, verses for calculating the date of Easter, 1349–1522, lections for feast-days in the diocese of Norwich (2nd half of the 15th century)
B.viii	Fleta (1st half of the 14th century)
B.ix	Register of Thomas Goodrich, chancellor of England (1551–53)
B.xi	Repertory of family pedigrees in the Office of Arms, compiled by William Camden (d. 1623) (1st quarter of the 17th century)
B.xii	4 items, damaged by fire in 1731: Names of the families who came to England with William the Conqueror, incorporating verses on King Harold II, ordinances for the funeral of a nobleman, account of the reign of King Henry VII of England; Record of the trial of the Knights Templar in England (1st quarter of the 13th century); Account of the creation of Prince Henry of England (the future King Henry VIII) as duke of York, 1494; Register of Richard, Duke of Gloucester (2nd half of the 15th century-2nd half of the 16th century).
B.xiii	2 codices: Hugh of Saint-Victor, Chronicle; Chronicle of Melrose Abbey, AD 1-249; Gerald of Wales, De principis instructione
C.i	Miscellaneous documents in the hand of William Camden (d. 1623); Epitome of Domesday Book; inquisition temp. King Edward I of England
C.ii	16 items, outer edges of leaves damaged by fire in 1731. Names of those holding feudal service in Kent (2nd half of the 15th century); Pleas for the county of Kent, Edward II, historical excerpts from the works of Gildas, Aelred of Rievaulx, William of Malmesbury and other authors; Transcript of the laws of the kings of Kent (4th quarter of the 16th century – 1st quarter of the 17th century); Excerpts from Textus Roffensis, transcribed by Francis Tate; Excerpts from John of Worcester, Chronicle (1st quarter of the 17th century); Account of the foundation of Fountains Abbey (2nd half of the 16th century); List of the archbishops of Canterbury from Augustine (597–604) to Reginald Pole (1556–58) (3rd quarter of the 16th century); John Herd, Historia Anglicana (3rd quarter of the 16th century); Confession of Edmund of Woodstock, Earl of Kent, concerning the planned restoration of Edward II, king of England, letters of John Stratford, archbishop of Canterbury, and Edward III (mid 16th century); Excerpts from the Curia Regis Rolls, (2nd half of the 16th century); Notes concerning the bishops of Durham (2nd half of the 16th century); Rental of Sheen Charterhouse (1532); Note of the royal grants made to the prior of Huntingdon (eid 16th century); Poem beginning 'Ordinibus distincta suis atque ebria dulci', dedicated to Rudolph II, Holy Roman Emperor (1576–1612), by the college of the Society of Jesus at Prague; Joannes Casparus Gevartius, In statuam equestrem Henrici magni, dedicated to Henri IV, king of France (1589–1610); Register of Abingdon Abbey (imperfect) (4th quarter of the 15th century)
C.iii	Correspondence of Robert Cotton.
C.iv	An Abstracte or Memoriall of such courses as haue beene used in militarye affayres bothe at lande and sea for defence and offence (14th century – 1st half of the 17th century)
C.v	Correspondence of William Camden (d. 1623) and index
C.vi	Materials by John Leland
C.vii	Collections of Nicholas Charles, Lancaster Herald (d. 1613)
C.viii	A treatise concerninge the Nobilitie accordinge to the Lawe of Englande; The orders of the king's house in the time of King Edward the 4th; Collections of English matters of England's Marshalls (1st quarter of the 17th century; 1601)
C.ix	De dignitate, (2nd half of the 15th century), La fundacion de la companie de Gartier dans le chastell de Wyndesor, verses on the twelve virtues of a nobleman, statutes of the Order of the Garter, The particular styles of the king's majestie, of the prynce and of the residence of the compaignions of the most noble Order of the Garter, assembled at the ffeaste of St. George holden at White Halle, Anno Domini 1604, treatise on the Order of the Garter (imperfect), excerpts on the Order of the Garter (imperfect); The voiage of my lorde marques of Northampton into France, 1551; miscellaneous papers
C.xii	Ailred of Rievaulx, De Regibus Saxorum
D.ix	South English Legendary (1st half of the 15th century)
D.x	Works related to Llanthony priory. Speculum uite Roberti Herefordensis episcopi by William of Wycombe, a history and genealogy of the lords of Brecon, and the History of Llanthony Priory.
E.iv	"Beauchamp Pageants", c. 1484–90
E.iii	Extracts from the close, patent, foreign, fine and liberate rolls (2nd half of the 16th century)
E.iv	Miscellany, including John Lydgate's Verses on the kings of England to Henry VI.
E.v	Materials by Alain Chartier
E.vi	Cronicques extraictes et abreges de France, Angleterre et Flandres (1st half of the 16th century)
E.vii	Ælfric's Lives of Saints; Ælfric, Interrogationes Sigewulfi in Genesin; De falsis diis (1st third of the 11th century)
E.viii	Ranulf Higden, Polychronicon, to AD 1339 (imperfect), incorporating Geoffrey of Monmouth, Uita Merlini
F.i	Letter from a man to his sister, written in confinement (2nd half of the 16th century); Book of receipts and deliveries of the Office of Ordnance, January 1580/1–December 1581
F.ii	This manuscript contains one of the two extant full-text translations of the Revelations of the mystic and saint, Birgitta of Sweden (b. 1303, d. 1373), known as the Liber celestis revelationum (Heavenly Book of Revelations), and the only extant Middle English translation of the Epistola solitarii ad reges (The Solitary's Letter to Kings) of Alfonso of Pecha (b. 1330, d. 1389), Bishop of Jaén. Alfonso wrote the Epistola as a preface to the final (eighth) book of the Liber, in which he defends Birgitta's status as a visionary and the veracity of her visions.
F.iii	Proceedings of the Navy Commission and list of witnesses (1608–1609)
F.iv	Thomas Smith, The Arte of Gunnerye (1608)
F.v	Robert Hare, Treatise on military discipline (1556-7)
F.vi	Historical and topographical papers of William Camden (d. 1623), incorporating items concerning Mary, queen of Scots, Elizabeth I, and Robert Devereux, 2nd earl of Essex, and including the charges brought against Thomas, Cardinal Wolsey; the indictment of Sir Walter Raleigh; The Deuise for alteratione of religione; a table of the weights of English and Scottish coins; the proclamation of Lady Jane Grey on assuming the crown of England, 1553; and an account of the Ruthwell Cross.
F.vii	Commonplace-book of William Worcester, including a contents-table of Chrétien le Gowayz de Saint-Maure (attributed), Methamorphoseos; Sedulius, Paschale carmen; Ralph Marham, Manipulus chronicorum ab mundi initio usque ad sua tempora; John Argentine, Actus publice habitus in academia Cantabrigiensi; John Gower, Verses in praise of King Henry IV of England; and John Somerset, Querimonia de ingratitudine universitatis Cantebrigie
F.viii	Nicholas Charles, Visitation of Huntingdonshire, 1613
F.ix	Genealogical and historical collections, including the arms of the abbeys of Thorney and Crowland; a list of the abbots of Peterborough Abbey; and a charter of Abbot Reginald of Ramsey.
F.x	Two documents in Welsh and English.
F.xi	Genealogical and historical collections, much of it published in William Camden, Remaines of a Greater Worke, concerning Britaine (London, 1605).

== Nero ==
A.i	Anglo-Saxon law codes and writings related to Wulfstan, bishop of Worcester and archbishop of York.
A.ii	Fragment of the Psalter of Jerome, leaf from a Book of Hours, an Early English prayer-book, Latin sermons, and an extract from Bede’s Historia ecclesiastica and Vita Sancti Cuthberti.
A.iii	Religious materials, including the Constitutions of the English Benedictine General Chapter, 1444, and the Rules and statutes of the Carthusian Order.
A.v	Computus and bestiary (Bestiairius) of Philippe de Thaon
A.x	Pearl, Sir Gawain and the Green Knight, Patience, and Cleanness
A.xi	(1) Carta caritatis posterior (13th century), (2) Pseudo-Turpin, De gestis Karoli magni; De miraculis apostoli Iacobi, (3) Orderic Vitalis and Gesta Normannorum Ducum, (4) excerpts from Pseudo-Jerome, De essentia diuinitatis, (5) Jerome, Aduersus Iouinianum.
B.i	Royal diplomatic correspondence concerning Portugal
B.viii	Royal diplomatic correspondence concerning Russia
B.xi	Royal diplomatic correspondence concerning Russia
C.iv	Winchester Psalter
C.v	Marianus Scotus, Chronicle; Bartholomew Cotton, Historia Anglicana
C.vii	Miscellany
C.ix	Miscellany
C.x	• Item 1 Autograph diary of Edward VI • Item 2 Letters of Edward VI to Henry VIII and Katherine Parr
C.xi	Robert Fabyan, Chronicle of England and France
D.i	Matthew of Paris, Liber additamentorum
D.ii	Order of Ceremony for the Knights of the Bath
D.iv	Lindisfarne Gospels
D.viii	Gerald of Wales, Descriptio Kambriae
D.x	Adamus Murimuthensis, Chronicon Sui Temporis
E.i	Miscellany in two parts. (1) The first and earliest part is the Cotton-Corpus Legendary, a Worcester manuscript (1050 x 1075) which includes Byrhtferth's Life of Oswald, his Life of Ecgwine and Lantfred of Winchester's Translatio et Miracula S. Swithuni. (2) In the second part, various texts with dates ranging between the 10th and 13th century are bound together. These include the Oswald Cartulary and IV Edgar (a law-code belonging to King Edgar, r. 959–975). Folios 182 and 183 of Cotton Nero E.i, pt.2 (Worcester cartulary), are now bound separately as London, BL, MS. Add. 46204.

== Otho ==
A.x	Æthelweard, Chronicon de Rebus Anglicis
A.xii	The Battle of Maldon (destroyed in 1731)
B.vi	The Cotton Genesis
B.x	Mary of Egypt (fragmentary)
B.x.165	Old English Rune poem (destroyed in 1731)
B.xi.2	Anglo-Saxon Chronicles G (mostly destroyed in 1731)
C.i	Volume containing fragments of the four Gospels, Dialogues of Gregory the Great, Ælfric's De creatore et creatura and other pieces in Old English.
C.ii	Adamus Murimuthensis, Chronicon Sui Temporis
C.v	Otho-Corpus Gospels (fragmentary)
C.ix	Letters of the Grand Masters of Rhodes to Henry VIII
C.xi	Layamon, Brut
E.i	Latin-Old English Glossary
E.iv	Letters of Intelligence from Paris to the Court of Elizabeth I
E.xiii	Legal miscellany, including some of the Proverbia Grecorum

== Tiberius ==
A.i	An Arabic manuscript on silk.
A.ii	Ottonian Gospels, donated to King Athelstan and by Athelstan to Christ Church, Canterbury.
A.iii	Miscellany. Includes: f. 3-27. Regularis Concordia (Item 1); Rule of St. Benedict (Item 43) f. 55–6v, 94v–7. Late Old English Handbook for a Confessor. Old English Lapidary
A.iv	3 works by John Gower.
A.v	Glastonbury Chronicle, based on the works of William of Malmesbury and John of Glastonbury.
A.vi	Abingdon Chronicle I (Anglo-Saxon Chronicle B)
A.vii/1	John Lydgate's The Pilgrimage of the Life of Man, bound with chronicles and other materials.
A.vii/2	25 paper folios containing lists of archbishops, bishops and kings, (1st quarter of the 17th century). Originally bound with A.vii/1.
A.viii	John Capgrave, De illustribus Henricis (mid 15th century)
A.ix	Abbreviatio de Gestis Normannorum ad Gulielmum I Regem Angliae
A.x	Historical miscellany, 8th-15th centuries
A.xi	Cartulary of St Mary's Abbey, Dublin (1st quarter of the 14th century – 2nd half of the 15th century)
A.xii	Commentaries by Alexander Nequam and William of Malmesbury and other documents
A.xiii	Worcester cartularies, including Hemming's Cartulary by Hemming
A.xiv	Bede, Historia Ecclesiastica
A.xv	Canterbury Letterbook, collection of letters
B.i	Abingdon Chronicle II (Anglo-Saxon Chronicle C). Singed by the 1731 fire. Also includes an Old English Translation of Orosius, Historiae adversus paganos; Menologium; Maxims II.
B.ii	Miscellany, including Miracles of St Edmund, in verse
B.iii	Calendar of Saints; computistical tables; lunar calendar with prognostics; solar and lunar tables; instructions for determining the dates of liturgical feasts from the Temporal cycle; Benedictional; sequence of prayers on the Litany; a memoria for St Ursinus of Bourges; Odo of Cluny, Collationes (imperfect)
B.iv	Collection of Chronicles, Histories and related material. Includes Worcester Chronicle (Anglo-Saxon Chronicle D)
B.v/1	Anglo-Saxon Miscellany. Includes Anglian collection of royal genealogies and Anglo-Saxon Cotton world map
B.vi	Documents relating to Anglo-French relations, Henry V; Gaspar de Perusio, Gaspar of Bergamo and others, Sermones, orationes et epistole.
B.viii/1	Liber Pontificalis (Pontifical of Glasgow) (3rd quarter of the 12th century). Outer edges damaged by water, 1731.
B.viii/2	The Coronation Book of Charles V of France
B.ix	Computistical tables; register of the abbots of Bury St. Edmunds; treatise attributed to John of Tewkesbury; Mahumet Bag-dadini, Liber divisionum; Roger Bacon, De speculis comburentibus
B.x	Muslim religious text; in Arabic
B.xi	Gregory the Great, Regula pastoralis (4th quarter of the 9th century)
B.xii	Thomas Beckington, Opus de iure regis Anglie ad regnum Francie (2nd half of the 15th century).
B.xiii	Gerald of Wales, Speculum Ecclesiae and De Rebus a Se Gestis; Roger of Ford, Speculum Ecclesiae (13th century)
C.i	Miscellany.
C.ii	Bede, Ecclesiastical History
C.iii	Honorius of Autun, Gemma animae sive De divinis officiis (4th quarter of the 12th century)
C.iv	Jan van Naaldwijk, Croonycke van Hollandt, to AD 1461 (1st quarter of the 16th century); Dit sijn die wonderlijcke oorloghen vanden doorluchteghen hoochgheboren prince, keyser Maximiliaen (1531?)
C.v	Works by Roger Bacon (mid 15th century); Cartulary of the hospital of St Thomas of Acon, London, volume 2 (2nd half of the 14th century-3rd quarter of the 15th century)
C.vi	Tiberius Psalter
C.vii	Chronicle of Henry Knighton
C.viii	Register of the lords of Tattershall (imperfect) (3rd quarter of the 15th century)
C.ix	Historia Vitae et Regni Ricardi Secundi from Evesham Abbey
C.x	Taxatio ecclesiastica Anglie et Wallie, 1291–1292 (4th quarter of the 13th century – 1st quarter of the 14th century)
C.xi	Einhard, Uita Caroli magni; genealogy of the kings of the Franks to AD 885; Uisio sancti Barontii monachi Longoretensis cenobii; Commemoratio de rebus sancte Traiectensis ecclesie; Radbod of Utrecht, account of the year AD 900; Regino of Prüm, Chronicon; Dormitio septem fratrum; Uisio Lietberto; Chronicle of Egmond Abbey, AD 640–1147, 1199–1305; De Berta et Margareta sanctimonialibus; Passio sancti Thome Cantuariensis
C.xii	Cartulary of Fountains Abbey, volume 1 (A–C); missal fragments.
C.xiii	Chronicle of John Brompton (attributed), AD 588–1199 (mid 15th century); psalter leaves.
D.i	Transcript of the journals of the clerk of the parliaments, 1 Henry VIII (1509–1510)–7 Edward VI (1553)
D.ii	Livre des monnoies (2nd half of the 16th century); Coats of arms of the monarchs of Europe and the nobility of France (2nd half of the 16th century); index
D.iii	Legendary; includes Vita Sancti Niniani
D.iv	A collection of hagiographical texts in two parts (975–1200) Formerly part of Winchester, Cathedral Library I; includes Bede, Historia Ecclesiastica; De abbatibus.
D.v	John Wheathampstead, Granarium, part II (A–Z) (2nd quarter of the 15th century); Imago mundi; Adomnán, De locis sanctis (4th quarter of the 14th century)
D.vi	Cartulary of Christ Church Twinham (Christchurch Priory Cartulary)
D.vii	John Trevisa, translation of Ranulf Higden's Polychronicon, prefaced by his Dialogue between a Lord and a Clerk (4th quarter of the 14th century)
D.viii	Privileges of English merchants, Edward III to Elizabeth I, including a map of the city of Hamburg and the river Elbe (4th quarter of the 15th century-1st half of the 17th century)
E.i	John Tynemouth, Sanctilogium Angliae, Walliae, Scotiae et Hiberniae (2nd half of the 14th century); in two volumes.
E.ii	Croniques de Pise (4th quarter of the 15th century)
E.iii	Rentals of chantries and guilds in Lincolnshire (2nd quarter of the 16th century)
E.iv	Winchcombe Chronicle; Calendar; Bede, De Temporum Ratione, De Natura Rerum, De Temporibus; Abbo of Fleury, De Differentia Circuli et Sphere, Computus; Helperic of Auxerre, De Computo; Robert the Lotharingian, Excerptio de Chronica Mariani; (1st half of the 12th century-1st quarter of the 14th century)
E.v	Cartulary of Northampton Abbey (1313 – 4th quarter of the 15th century)
E.vi	Historical miscellany, Register of St Albans Abbey (1st half of the 14th century – 1st half of the 15th century)
E.vii	William of Nassington, Speculum uite (imperfect); lamentation of the Blessed Virgin Mary on the Passion; The Form of Living (imperfect); The Gast of Gy; Northern Homily Cycle.
E.viii	Miscellaneous historical and heraldic papers; Account-roll of the expenses of the English army in Scotland, 27 Edward I (1298–1299)
E.ix	Miscellaneous historical, genealogical and heraldic papers, (4th quarter of the 16th century-1st half of the 17th century)
E.x	Sir George Buck, The History of King Richard the Third (1619). Damaged in 1731 fire.
E.xi	Unidentified theological tract(s); Charters relating to the hospital of St Julian, St Albans (4th quarter of the 14th century-1st quarter of the 15th century)

== Titus ==
A.i	Liber Eliensis (G)
A.xix	Ailred of Rievaulx, De Gestis Davidis Regis Scottorum
A.xv & A.xvi	John Joscelyn, an Old English-Latin dictionary
A.xxv	The Annals of Boyle
B.i	Order for the tournament on the Field of the Cloth of Gold, France, 1520
B.ii	Horoscope of Elizabeth I
B.viii	Document I – Sir Walter Ralegh's autograph journal of his second voyage to Guiana, 1617–18; Document II – Francis Drake graved and bremd his ship at 48 degrees on the backside of Labrador
C.xii	Gerald of Wales, De principis instructione
C.xvi	The Travels of Sir John Mandeville
D.iv	Latin Epigrams of Sir Thomas More, on the coronation of Henry VIII and Katherine of Aragon, 1509
D.xviii	Sawles Warde, Seinte Katherine and Hali Meiðhad (Katherine group)
D.xxvi & D.xxvii	Ælfwine's Prayerbook

== Vespasian ==
A.i	Vespasian Psalter
A.viii	New Minster Reformation Charter
A.xiv	A composite volume of three 12th-century manuscripts. These include: a collection of Welsh saints' Lives, an excerpt from Bede's "Historia Ecclesiastica Gentis Anglorum", and some of Alcuin of York's Epistulae.
A.xv	Vocabularium Cornicum
A.xviii	Ailred of Rievaulx, De Gestis Davidis Regis Scottorum
A.xix	Miscellany
B.vi	includes Anglian Collection V
B.ix	History of the foundation of the hospital and priory of St Bartholomew, Smithfield
B.xi	Chronicle of Hagnaby Abbey
B.xx	Goscelin of Saint-Bertin, Lives of the Canterbury saints
C.i	Correspondence of the Spanish royal court with the court of Henry VIII
D.vi	Miscellany, including the Old Kentish Glosses.
D.xii	Latin Hymnal with Old English gloss
D.xiv	Miscellany of the mid-12th century. It has most of Ælfric's Catholic Homilies (first and second series) and cites from Ælfric's letters to Sigeferth and Wulfstan. Other works include a Life of Saint Neot; homily on the Phoenix; Old English Dicts of Cato; prognostications; the Vision of St Furseus; translations of Ralph d'Escures' homily on Mary; and excerpts from Honorius Augustodunensis, Elucidarium.
D.xix	(1) Nigel Witeker, Miracula sancte Dei genitricis uirginis Marie and other poems; (2) Ely Chronicle (12th century); (3) Easter-table chronicle; (4) Hildebert of Le Mans, certain letters and sermons.
E.iv	Miscellany

== Vitellius ==
A.viii	Annals of Lacock Abbey
A.x	Statutes of Lichfield Cathedral
A.xii	Penitential of Bartholomew, Bishop of Exeter
A.xiii	Genealogy of the Dukes of Normandy
A.xv	Nowell Codex: ff 1: Psalter leaf removed by British Library to form Royal MS 13 D I*, f 37. ff 2: Cotton endleaf ff 3: Medieval endleaf with memoranda ff 4-93: Soliloquies of Augustine, Gospel of Nicodemus, Debate of Solomon and Saturn, Homily on St. Quintin ff 94-209: Homily on St. Christopher, Marvels of the East, Letter of Alexander the Great to Aristotle, Beowulf, Judith
A.xx	Descriptio Constantinopolis
B.ii	Diplomatic letters to Henry VIII. Singed by fire.
B.iv	Bull of Pope Leo X, 1521, granting Henry VIII the title "Defender of the Faith". Badly damaged by fire, 1731
B.v	Letters of Pope Adrian VI to Henry VIII
B.viii	Letters of Pope Clement VII to Henry VIII
C.iii	Anglo-Saxon Herbal
C.viii	Miscellany, including Epistles of St. Paul from Durham and Life of St Kentigern
C.x	Gerald of Wales, Descriptio Kambriae and De iure et statu meneuensis ecclesiae
C.xi	Treaty of Marriage between Louis XII of France and Mary Tudor
C.xvii	The Manner of Sir Philip Sidney's Death
E.ii	Grandes Chroniques de France
E.v	Gerald of Wales, De iure et statu meneuensis ecclesiae, Descriptio Kambriae, Retractationes, Catalogus breuior librorum suorum, poems
E.vi	Johannes a Leydis, Chronicle of Holland (autograph of first edition)
E.vii	Giraldus Cambrensis, Life and Miracles of St Æthelberht
E.xiii	The Intermediate Compilation+Crowland Annals, Decretals
E.xviii	Psalter with interlinear Old English Gloss
F.xi	Vitellius Psalter (Irish)
