= Obedientiary =

Lesser official of a monastery appointed by will of the superior

In the Middle Ages, an obedientiary or obedienciary (from the Latin obedientiarius, meaning someone in an 'obedient', i.e. subordinate, position) was a lesser official of a monastery appointed by will of the superior.

In some cases the word is used to include all those who held office beneath the abbot, but more frequently the prior and sub-prior — who technically qualify in an abbacy — are excluded from those signified by it.

== Functions ==
To the obedientiaries were assigned the various duties pertaining to their different offices and they possessed considerable power in their own departments. There was always a right of appeal to the abbot or equivalent superior, but in practice most details were settled by the "customary" of the monastery.

=== Permanent functions ===
The list that follows gives the usual titles of the obedientiaries, but in some monasteries other names were used and other official positions may be found: thus, for example, to this day, in the great Swiss monastery of Einsiedeln the name "dean" is given to the official who is called prior in all other Benedictine houses.

(1) The "cantor" or "precentor", usually assisted by a "sub-cantor", or "succentor".

(2) The sacrist, or sacristan, who had charge of the monastic church and of all things necessary for the services. He had, as a rule, several assistants:

- the subsacrist, also known as the secretary, the "matricularius", or the master of work;
- the treasurer;
- the "revestiarius".

(3) The cellarer, or bursar, who acted as chief purveyor of all foodstuffs to the monastery and as general steward. In recent times the name procurator is often found used for this official. He had as assistants:

- the subcellarer;
- the "granatorius". Chapter xxxi of St. Benedict's Rule tells "What kind of man the Cellarer ought to be"; in practice this position is the most responsible one after that of abbot or superior.

(4) The refectorian, who had charge of the frater or refectory and its furniture, including such things as crockery, cloths, dishes, spoons, forks etc.

(5) The kitchener, who presided over the cookery department, not only for the community but for all guests, dependants etc.

(6) The novice master whose assistant was sometimes called the "zelator".

(7) The infirmarian, besides looking after the sick brethren, was also responsible for the quarterly "blood letting" of the monks, a custom almost universal in medieval monasteries.

(8) The guest-master, whose duties are dealt with in chapter 53 of St. Benedict's Rule.

(9) The almoner.

(10) The chamberlain, or "vestiarius".

=== Weekly duties ===
Besides these officials who were appointed more or less permanently, there were certain others appointed for a week at a time to carry out various duties. These positions were usually filled in turn by all below the rank of sub-prior, though very busy officials, e. g. the cellarer, might be excused.

The chief of these was the hebdomadarian, or priest for the week. It was his duty to sing the conventual mass on all days during the week, to intone the Deus in adjutorium at the beginning of each of the canonical hours, to bless holy water etc.

The antiphoner was also appointed for a week at a time. It was his duty to read or sing the invitatory at Matins, to give out the first antiphon at the Psalms, and also the versicles, responsoria after the lessons etc.

The weekly reader and servers in the kitchen and refectory entered upon their duties on Sunday when, in company with the servers of the previous week, they had to ask and receive a special blessing in choir as directed in chapters xxxv and xxxviii of St. Benedict's Rule.

Nowadays the tendency is towards a simplification in the details of monastic life and consequently to a reduction in the number of officials in a monastery (in most cases inevitable due to fewer vocations), but all the more important offices named above still exist in major monasteries though the name obedientiaries has quite dropped out of everyday use.

== Sources ==
- Herbermann, Charles, ed. (1913). "Obedientiaries". Catholic Encyclopedia. New York: Robert Appleton Company.
