= Henry Savile =

Henry Savile may refer to:

- Henry Savile (died 1558) (1498–1558), MP for Yorkshire
- Henry Savile (died 1569) (1518–1569), MP for Yorkshire and Grantham
- Henry Savile (Bible translator) (1549–1622), English scholar and Member of the Parliament
- Henry Savile of Banke (1568–1617), English manuscript and book collector
- Sir Henry Savile, 1st Baronet (1579–1632), English politician
- Henry Savile (politician) (1642–1687), English courtier and diplomat
