= Winchcombe Annals =

The Winchcombe Annals, sometimes known as the Later Winchcombe Annals, are a Latin chronicle compiled c. 1240 by an anonymous monk at the Benedictine abbey, Winchcombe Abbey.

The manuscript is damaged and only the portion from 1049 to 1232 remain although it was a longer document. The source material up to 1181 is from the Winchcombe Chronicle and from thereon from another annal. The manuscript also holds pictorial representation of a sun dial, and the twelve winds of Aristotle.

It is currently in the British Library at Cotton MS Faustina B I, fol. 12r–29v.
