= Ronald Waldron =

Ronald Waldron may refer to:

- Ron Waldron (born 1933), Welsh rugby coach
- R. A. Waldron (Ronald Alan Waldron, born 1927), English medievalist
