= Winchcombe Chronicle =

The Winchcombe Chronicle is a Latin chronicle of the town of Winchcombe from about 1140-1145.

The original text was drafted in the 1140s, and later extended to 1181. The chronicle is also sometimes known as the Annals of Winchcombe, though it differs from the earlier Winchcombe Annals, produced by the same Abbey.

The Latin chronicle is anonymous, but was written in the Benedictine, Winchcombe Abbey (Gloucestershire).

The manuscript is in two parts. The first, the work of a single scribe, is a world history from creation to 1122 which takes much of its material from John of Worcester's Chronica chronicarum.

The addendum contains more recent material. The manuscript also has numerous margin notes of more recent events.

The manuscript is currently held at the British Library as part of the Cotton collection and is found at BL, Cotton Tiberius E iv, folios 1r-27v.
