= Versicle =

Short verse in Catholic liturgy

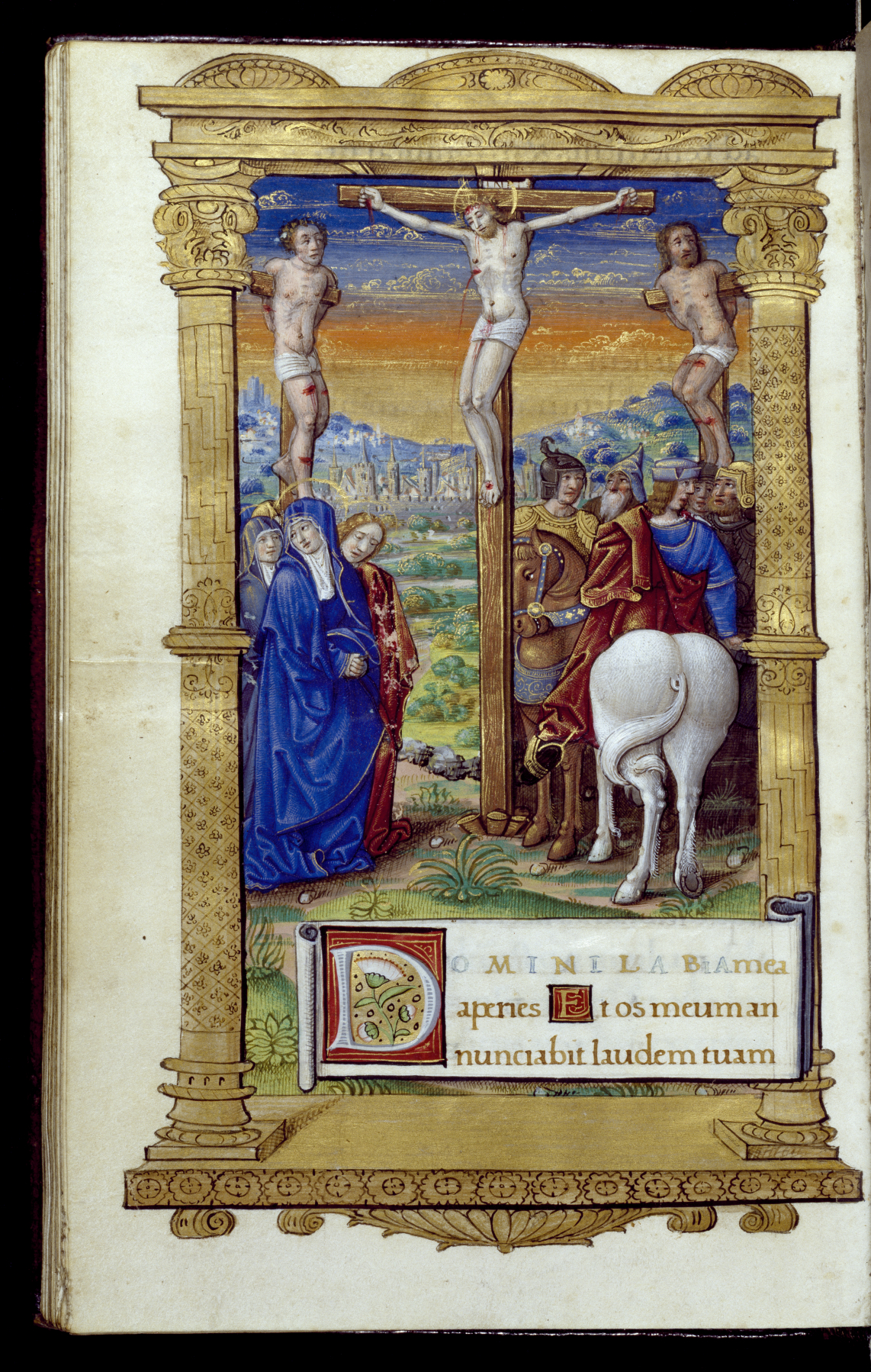
The very first versicle of the Liturgy of hours: Domine labia mea aperies – et os meum annuniabit laudem tuam

A versicle (from Latin versiculus, 'short verse') is a short two- or four-line verse that is sung or recited in the liturgy alternating between the celebrant, hebdomadarian or cantor and the congregation. It is usually a psalm verse in two parts. A series of versicles and responses forms the preces. The versicle is sung recitatively on a note with a simple cadence. The letter ℣ indicates the first part of the versicle in many liturgical books; ℟ indicates the answer of the congregation. In case the faithful prays in solitude, he sings or recites both parts of the versicle.

The opening versicle before the first liturgical hour celebrated on that day is "Lord, open our lips: And we shall praise your name". In the Liturgy of the Hours, a versicle opens the hour together with the doxology. At the beginning of the Hours, when either this versicle or "O God, come to our aid" is sung or recited, everyone makes the sign of the cross.

The General Instruction on the Liturgy of the Hours states that the invitatory and the versicle "invite the faithful to sing the praises of God, hear his voice and look forward to the 'Rest of the Lord'".

In the Matins or the office of readings versicles lead from the psalmody to the readings; in the Little Hours they are the answer to the chapter. According to the Church, the versicles reply to the short reading, and the brief response "is a kind of acclamation, and enables the word of God to penetrate more deeply into the mind and heart of the person reciting or listening".

In the prayer of a monastery, the hebdomadarian recites the first part of the verse, and the convent or congregation responds.

Sit nomen Domini benedictum – versicle when granting the episcopal blessing

Versicles are also part of the rite of various blessings and consecrations. The episcopal blessing is introduced by a versicle; in the sacramental blessing, a versicle leads from the singing of the Tantum ergo to the collect. In litanies or in prayers like the Angelus and the Regina coeli there is a versicle before the oration.

== Sources ==
- J. Harper, The forms and orders of Western liturgy from the tenth to the eighteenth century, Oxford, 1991.
- D. Hiley, P. Le Huray, Versicle, in The New Grove Dictionary of Music and Musicians, London; New York, 2001.
