= Handbook for a Confessor =

Eleventh-century collection of pentential texts

Late Old English Handbook for the Use of a Confessor
- Audience: priests
- Language: Old English, some medieval Latin
- Date: early 11th century
- Principal manuscript(s): CCCC MS 201 and Cotton MS Tiberius A III
- Genre: compilation of penitential texts

Handbook for a Confessor (also Old English Handbook, or in full, Late Old English Handbook for the Use of a Confessor) is a compilation of Old English and Latin penitential texts associated with – and possibly authored or adapted by – Wulfstan (II), Archbishop of York (d. 1023). The handbook was intended for the use of parish priests in hearing confession and determining penances. Its transmission in the manuscripts (see below) seems to bear witness to Wulfstan's profound concern with these sacraments and their regulation, an impression which is similarly borne out by his Canons of Edgar, a guide of ecclesiastical law also targeted at priests. The handbook is a derivative work, based largely on earlier vernacular representatives of the penitential genre such as the Scrifboc (or Confessionale Pseudo-Ecgberhti) and the Old English Penitential (or Paenitentiale Pseudo-Ecgberhti). Nevertheless, a unique quality seems to lie in the more or less systematic way it seeks to integrate various points of concern, including the proper formulae for confession and instructions on the administration of confession, the prescription of penances and their commutation.

== Manuscripts ==
The original exemplar is lost, but extracts from the handbook survive in six manuscripts, three of which have been identified by scholars as Wulfstan's so-called 'commonplace books', i.e. collections used by Wulfstan for a large variety of purposes.

1. Brussels, Bibliothèque Royale, MS 8558–63 (2498), ff. 132–9v. Commonplace book.
2. Cambridge, Corpus Christi College, MS 201, pp. 114–25, 170. The principal text for Fowler's edition; associated with Wulfstan's commonplace books.
3. Cambridge, Corpus Christi College, MS 265, pp. 72–83. Commonplace book.
4. London, British Library, Cotton MS Tiberius A III, ff. 55–6v, 94v–7.
5. Oxford, Bodleian Library, MS Junius 121, ff. 23v–4, 54v–7v. Commonplace book.
6. Oxford, Bodleian Library, MS Laud Misc. 482, ff. 28v, 40–3v, 464. Of Worcester provenance.

== Contents ==
The most complete copies of the handbook are represented by CCCC MS 201 and Cotton MS Tiberius A III, while the other four manuscripts present a narrower selection of texts. As a whole, the collection contains six texts, one in Latin (I) and five in Old English (II-VI).

- I. Ordo Confessionis (in Latin); broadly similar to the early 8th-century Othmarus ad discipulos by Othmar, abbot of St Gall.
- II. A confessional formula for recitation, consisting of a list of sins and the penitent's request for forgiveness. A longer version appears in Cotton MS Vespasian D XX (mid-10th century).
- III. General directions for a confessor. This text recalls passages in law-codes drafted by Wulfstan for King Æthelred, such as V Æthelred and VI Æthelred.
- IV. A short penitential, based chiefly on the Old English Penitential.
- V. Be dædbetan (“For penitents”), further instructions for the confessor, with commentary on types of penance, the attention to be given to the penitent's character and situation, provisions of commutation in the form of monetary payments and alms-giving, and a concluding paragraph on concessions for the sick.
- VI. Be mihtigum mannum (“For powerful men”), on commutations for the rich.

For three Old English texts, here numbered III, V and VI, no specific relationship to earlier authorities can be pinpointed, except in individual passages.

== See also ==
- Works of Wulfstan of York
