= Cellarium =

Storeroom, usually in a medieval monastery

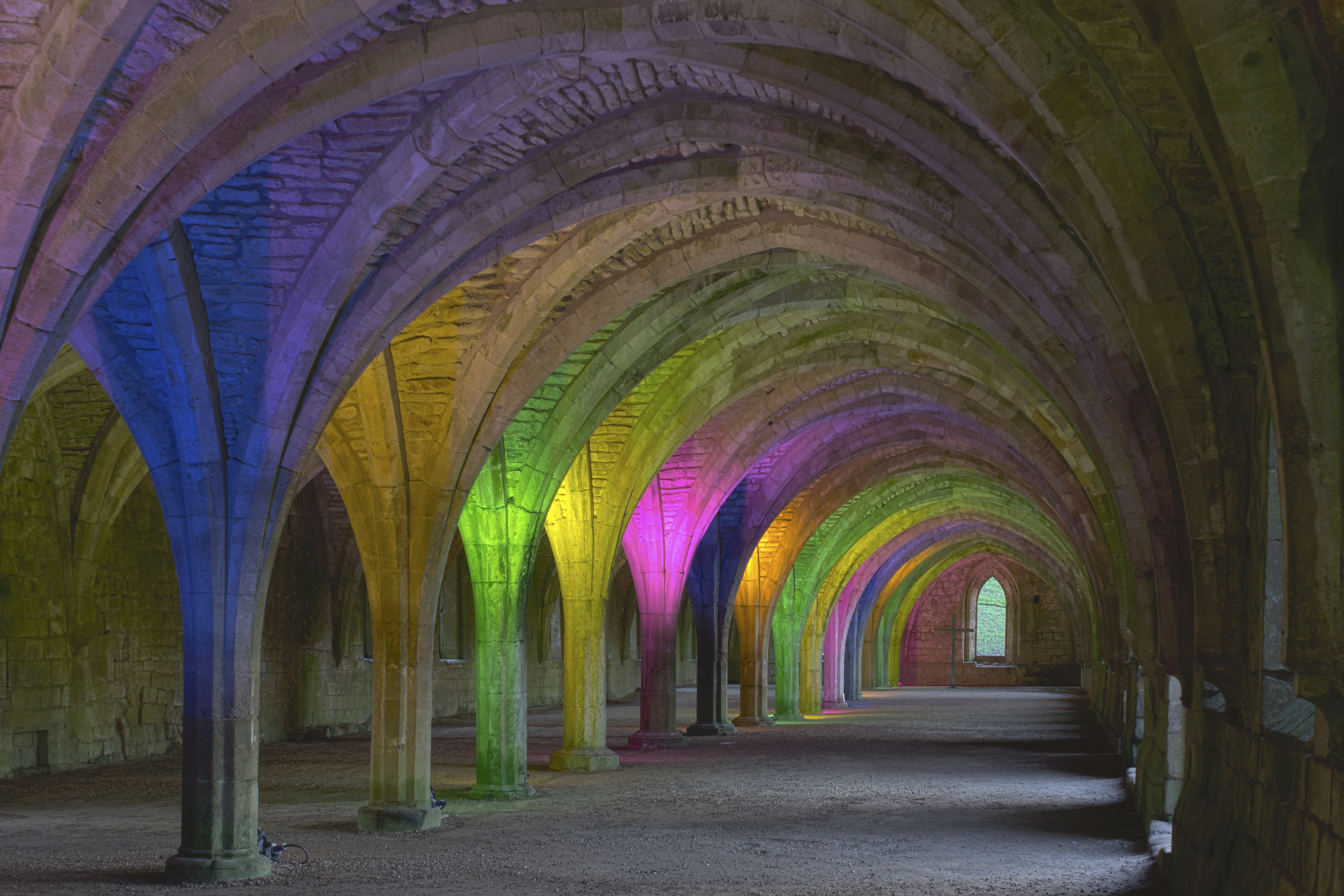
The cellarium of Fountains Abbey, England

A cellarium (from the Latin cella, "pantry"), also known as an undercroft, was a storehouse or storeroom, usually in a medieval monastery or castle. In English monasteries, it was usually located in or under the buildings on the west range of the cloister.

The monastery's supplies of food, ale and wines were stored there, under the supervision of the cellarer, one of the monastery's obedientiaries. The cellarer acted as chief purveyor of all foodstuffs to the monastery and as general steward. He was often assisted by a sub-cellarer.
