= Malcolm Andrew =

British author, teacher, and scholar

- Born: 27 January 1945 (age 81); Paddock Wood, Kent
- Occupations: Author and academic, now retired
- Writing career
- Genre: Medieval literature

Malcolm Andrew is an author, teacher and scholar who was previously Professor of English Language and Literature at Queen's University Belfast. He started teaching at Queen's in 1985, before which he had worked at the University of East Anglia. He retired in 2007. He also served as Head of School (1986–92), Dean of Humanities (1992–98), and Pro-Vice-Chancellor (1998–2002).

He was convener of the English language board of the British national Arts and Humanities Research Board for several years.

== Works ==
- Andrew, Malcolm; Waldron, Ronald Alan (1978). The Poems of the Pearl Manuscript: Pearl, Cleanness, Patience, Sir Gawain and the Green Knight. Berkeley: University of California Press. pp. 373. ISBN 978-0-85989-726-6. OCLC 5241542.
- Finch, Casey; Waldron, Ronald Alan; Andrew, Malcolm; Peterson, Clifford J. (1993). The Complete Works of the Pearl Poet. Berkeley: University of California Press. p. 488. ISBN 978-0-520-07871-0. OCLC 25409834.
- Andrew, Malcolm; Chaucer, Geoffrey; Waldron, Ronald Alan; Ransom, Daniel J.; Levy, Lynne Hunt; Moorman, Charles (1993). The Variorum Chaucer: The General Prologue. Norman, Oklahoma; London: University of Oklahoma Press. pp. 298 + 623. ISBN 978-0-8061-2552-7. OCLC 277170010. (Dr. Andrew has indicated that he considers The Variorum Chaucer to be his magnum opus.)
- Andrew, Malcolm (2006). The Palgrave Literary Dictionary of Chaucer. Basingstoke [England]; New York: Palgrave Macmillan. p. 336. ISBN 978-0-333-99808-3. OCLC 61821876.
