= Otho-Corpus Gospels =

Manuscript in the British Library

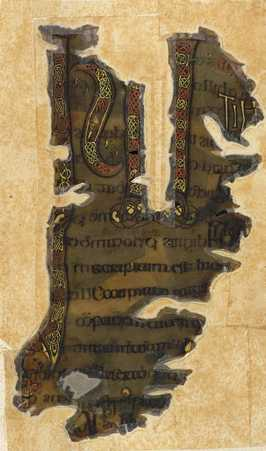
The incipit page from the Gospel of Mark from the Otho-Corpus Gospels.

The Otho-Corpus Gospels is a badly damaged and fragmentary 8th century illuminated manuscript. It was part of the Cotton library and was mostly burnt in the 1731 fire at Ashburnham House. The manuscript now survives as charred fragments in the British Library (MS Cotton Otho C V). Thirty six pages of the manuscript were not in the Cotton collection and survived the fire. They are now in the library of Corpus Christi College, Cambridge (MS 197B).

== Original manuscript ==
The manuscript, before the fire, was a major insular Gospel Book with close ties to the Lindisfarne Gospels, the Book of Kells and the Durham Cathedral Library, MS A. II. 10., the Echternach Gospels, and other insular manuscripts, with both textual and decorative similarities. Although it is not known where or when this manuscript was made, the similarities to the manuscripts noted above make it likely that it was made in one of the monasteries in the network of monasteries founded by St. Columba.

== Surviving fragments ==
The Lion of Mark.

The extant fragments show that the manuscript was decorated in much the same style as other Insular Gospel Books. The incipit pages of the Gospels had large decorated initials, which dominated the page similar to those in the Lindifarne Gospels, the Book of Durrow, the Book of Kells and other Insular Gospel Books. For example, folio 28 recto in the British Library contains the remnant of the incipit page to the Gospel of Mark. All that is still legible is a portion of the word "Initium". (In the Vulgate, Mark begins "Initium evangelii Iesu Christi"). The letters "INI" are formed into a large monogram decorated with red and yellow knotwork. This page was so damaged and shrunk by the fire that the vellum has become translucent and the text on the verso side is visible on the recto side.

In many of the insular gospels, such as the Lindisfarne Gospels, and the Book of Kells, each Gospel has an Evangelist portrait before the Gospel. In many other insular gospels, such as the Book of Durrow and the Echternach Gospels, the portrait is replaced by a full page miniature of the Evangelist's symbol. Folio 27 recto (see illustration on the left) in the British Library, which is one of the best preserved pages of this manuscript, contains the image of the lion of Mark. This page bears a remarkable stylistic similarity to the corresponding page in the Echternach Gospels, (see here) and gives a hint as to the quality of the manuscript before the fire.

== Astle's copy ==
A copy of a page of the prefatory material for Mark was made in 1725 for the Earl of Oxford, and used by Thomas Astle for his book The Origin and Progress of Writing, which was published in 1784. The letters at the top of the page were display capitals, which were used to begin major sections of text. Further down the page there is a second set of capitals in a different style which are surrounded by a block of small red dots. At the bottom of the page the scribe of the copy included a "sampler" of letter forms found in the manuscript which was not located on the original page. Astle's manuscript containing the copy is also in the British Library (Stowe MS 1061, fol. 36r).

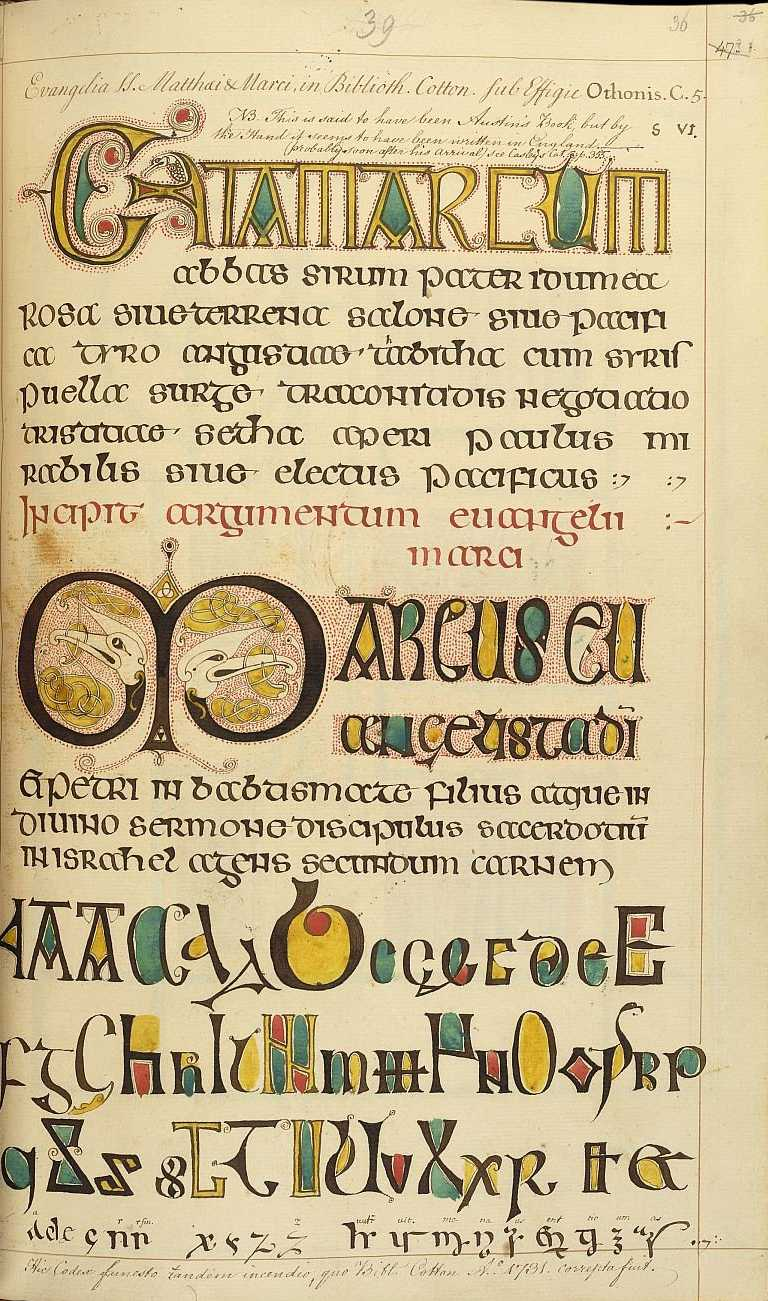
Astle's copy of the prefatory material of Mark.

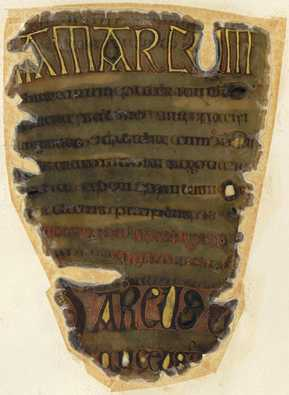
The surviving fragment of the original page.
