= Henry Savile of Banke =

British book collector

Henry Savile of Banke (1568 – 29 April 1617) was an English manuscript and book collector. He was the son of Henry Savile of Blaithroyd, in Southowram, Halifax and a distant relative of Sir Henry Savile (1549–1622). He was admitted to Merton College and St Alban Hall, Oxford, becoming BA in 1592 and MA in 1595. He was licensed to practice physic in 1601. Very little is known of his life except for his manuscript collection. Many of his manuscripts later became part of such collections like that of Sir Robert Cotton (1571–1631), including one of the most important Middle English manuscripts, the Pearl Manuscript.

== Collection ==
There are two surviving catalogues of Savile's manuscript collection, preserved as part of Add. MS 35213 and Harley MS 1879, both of which are now in the collections of British Library in London. Savile's collection is directly linked to the survival of medieval manuscripts from the north of England after the destruction of monasteries in the sixteenth century.
