= De Iniusta Vexacione Willelmi Episcopi Primi =

11th-century Latin written trial record

- Of the Unjust Persecution of the Bishop William I
- Language: medieval Latin
- Date: early through second quarter 12th century
- Provenance: Durham Cathedral
- Manuscript(s): Bodleian MS Fairfax 6; Bodleian MS Laud misc 700; Hales MS 114; Cotton MS Claudius D IV; Harley MS 4843; Durham Bishop Cosins Library MS V ii
- Principal manuscript(s): Bodleian MS Fairfax 6
- First printed edition: Monasticon Anglicanum, first volume, 1655
- Genre: Legal account
- Subject: Account of the trial of Bishop William de St-Calais
- Period covered: 1080–1096

De Iniusta Vexacione Willelmi Episcopi Primi (Note: Of the Unjust Persecution of the Bishop William I, or sometimes translated as The Unjust Harassment of the First Bishop William.) is a late 11th-century historical work detailing the trial of William de St-Calais, a medieval Norman Bishop of Durham from 1081 to 1096. It is the first surviving detailed account of an English trial before the king, and as such is an important source for historians.

The work consists of three sections: an introduction, a central section that details the trial itself, and a conclusion. The introduction and conclusion summarise St-Calais' career before and after the trial. Although the authenticity of the main account has been challenged in the past, most historians consider it a contemporary record of the trial. Six manuscripts containing the work survive, and it was first printed in 1655, with other editions, including translations, appearing after that.

== Background ==
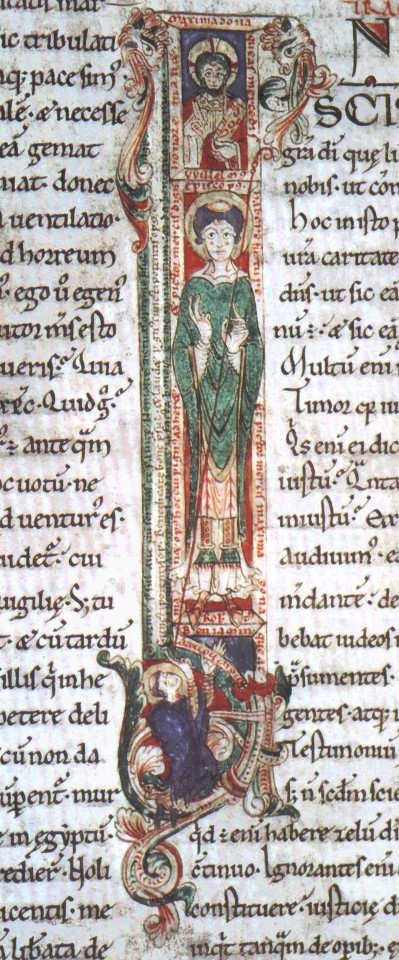
William de St-Calais pictured in an 11th-century illuminated manuscript. St-Calais is the central figure, and the manuscript's scribe is at his feet.

The trial which De Iniusta details took place at Salisbury in November 1088, and concerned St-Calais' equivocal actions in the revolt against King William II's rule that had taken place earlier in the year. The work is one of the primary sources for the early part of King William II's reign, and was probably compiled from notes taken by the bishop's subordinates and then worked into a tractate that was designed to present the bishop's case in the best light. It was probably composed during the 1090s when St-Calais was engaged in an effort to regain the favour of King William after his return from the sentence of exile he received at the trial.

This work is the earliest surviving detailed contemporary report of an English state-trial. As such, it is an important source for how the English kings' curia regis, or king's court, functioned when it dealt with legal cases.

== Trial ==
De Iniusta states that St-Calais was brought before the king and royal court for trial on 2 November 1088, at Salisbury, the king having confiscated the bishop's lands before the trial. At the trial, St-Calais held that as a bishop, he could not be tried in a secular court, and he refused to answer the accusations. Lanfranc, Archbishop of Canterbury, presented the king's case, declaring that the confiscated lands had been held as fiefs, and thus St-Calais could be tried as a vassal, not as a bishop. St-Calais objected and continued to refuse to answer the allegations. After numerous conferences and discussions, the court held that St-Calais could be tried as a vassal in a feudal court. St-Calais then appealed to Rome, but his request was rejected by the king and the judges. Those judging the case held that because St-Calais never answered the formal accusation, and because he appealed to Rome, his fief, or the lands he held as a bishop, was forfeit.

During the course of the trial, Lanfranc is said to have stated that the court was "trying you not in your capacity as bishop, but in regard to your fief; and in this way we judged the bishop of Bayeux in regard to his fief before the present king's father, and that king did not summon him to that plea as bishop but as brother and earl." Unlike the later case of Thomas Becket, St-Calais received little sympathy from his fellow bishops. Most of the bishops and barons who judged the case seem to have felt that the appeal to Rome was made to avoid having to answer an accusation that St-Calais knew was true. The final judgement was only reached after the king lost his temper and exclaimed: "Believe me, bishop, you're not going back to Durham, and your men aren't going to stay at Durham, and you're not going to go free, until you release the castle."

== Contents and authenticity ==
De Iniusta is actually a composite work. The account of the trial itself, often termed the Libellus, is the central part of the work, and is probably the original account. To the Libellus was added an introduction which summarises St-Calais' career before the trial. A conclusion that relates the bishop's life after the trial is appended to the end of the work. The introduction and conclusion are often referred to as the Vita, or Life.

The historian H. S. Offler in 1951 felt that the Libellus was not a contemporary account of the trial, and instead dated from the second quarter of the 12th century and was produced at Durham. More recent scholars, including W. M. Aird, Frank Barlow, and Emma Mason have concluded that the work is indeed a contemporary record of the trial. Barlow bases his belief in the authenticity on the level of detail and the fact that the account lacks all knowledge of events outside the court, and explains that Offler's concerns can be explained by the late date for all the manuscripts, which allowed scribal errors to creep in. Offler reaffirmed his position in 1990, arguing that "all the puzzles" in the text could not "be explained away by a defective tradition" and at least some "are the consequences of error by an author who, however skilled, was at work well after 1088."

One of the reasons the account's authenticity has been questioned is the fact that it claims St-Calais was knowledgeable in canon law. Offler doubted that canon law had penetrated to England to any great degree in 1088. The historian Mark Philpott, however, argues that St-Calais was knowledgeable in canon law, since he owned a copy of one of the bases of canon law, the False Decretals. The bishop's manuscript of the Decretals still survives.

Historians agree that the introduction and conclusion were added by a different author than that of the Libellus. Who that was, however, is open to debate. The historian C. W. David felt that it was based on the work of the chronicler Symeon of Durham, which thus made a credible date for the creation sometime between 1109 and 1129. (Note: The earliest possible date of 1109 is from the fact that the tract refers to Anselm, the Archbishop of Canterbury, as of "sainted memory". Anselm died in 1109. The end date is supplied by David's belief that the introduction and conclusion were used by Symeon of Durham's Historia Regum, which was written in 1129.) David also felt that the Vita was used by a later work of Symeon's, the Historia Regum. Offler, however, felt that although Symeon knew of the Libellus, there was no evidence that he used the Vita, which would leave the author of the Vita unclear.

== Manuscripts and printed editions ==
In manuscripts, the De Iniusta normally appears alongside Symeon of Durham's Historiae Ecclesiae Dunelmensis. There are at least six manuscripts of the De Iniusta, with the earliest being Bodleian MS Fairfax 6, probably dating to around 1375. The others are Bodleian MS Laud misc. 700 folios 66–74v, Hales MS 114 folios 63–75v (although this is missing the introduction and part of the conclusion), Cotton MS Claudius D IV folios 48–54 (likewise missing the introduction and parts of the conclusion), Harleian MS 4843 folios 224–231, and Durham Bishop Cosins Library MS V ii 6 folio 88–98.

The first printed edition of the De Iniusta appeared in the first volume of William Dugdale's Monasticon Anglicanum published between 1655. It has also been published as part of the collected works of Symeon of Durham, edited by Thomas Arnold in two volumes of the Rolls Series published in 1882–1885. A translation of the work appeared in Joseph Stevenson's The Church Historians of England, published between 1853 and 1858; specifically in volume iii, part ii. A more recent translation appeared in the English Historical Documents series, volume ii.
