= Peter of Ickham =

English chronicler

- Died: 4 May 1295
- Occupation: chronicler

Peter of Ickham (died on 4 May 1295) was an English chronicler.

== Biography ==
Ickham is said to have derived his name from the village of Ickham, near Canterbury; Bale and Pits state that he spent much time at the University of Paris, in close literary intimacy with Philip, the chancellor of the university (i.e., apparently Philippe de Grève, chancellor from 1218 to 1237). The compilers of the 'Hist. Littér, de la France' say he was invited to France by Philip III.

On leaving Paris, he seems to have become a monk at Canterbury. Bale and Pits quote Leland's 'Collectanea' for the statement that he flourished in 1274, but the printed copies of Leland do not contain the passage; the name appears in a list of the monks of the priory of Canterbury under the year 1294. A Peter of Ickham, however, according to an obituary of the monks of Christ Church, Canterbury, by Thomas Cowston, died in 1289, but another manuscript in the same library (Wharton MS. iii. ap. Tanner) says he died in 1295.

Ickham is usually regarded, apparently on the authority of Dr. Caius, as the author of the meagre and somewhat confused chronicle entitled 'Chronicon de Regibus Angliæ successive regnantibus a tempore Bruti' (or 'Compilatio de Gestis Britonum et Anglorum'), extant (with continuations) in thirteen or fourteen manuscripts, terminating at various dates between 1272 and 1471; but the chronicle shows signs of having been written at Worcester rather than at Canterbury (Hardy, u.s.) Bale and Pits also ascribe to Ickham's Genealogies of the Kings of Britain and England, written in French during his stay in Paris. They probably refer to the two treatises 'Le livere de reis de Brittame' and 'Le livere de reis de Engleterre,' which were edited by Mr. Glover in 1865 for the Rolls Series. They contain, however, no distinct indication of their authorship.
