= Bernard André =

French Augustinian friar (1450–1522)

Bernard André, O.E.S.A. (1450–1522), also known as Bernard Andreas André, was a French Augustinian friar, poet, and historian. He chronicled the reign of Henry VII of England and was a poet laureate.

== Biography ==
A native of Toulouse, André was a tutor to Prince Arthur of England, and probably had a share in the education of the future King Henry VIII. He was also a tutor at Oxford. It is believed that he was blind.

== Works ==
André's writings are mostly in Latin. They are often of typical contemporary Renaissance styles in thought and diction. His Historia Henrici Septimi was edited (1858) by James Gairdner, who noted André's chronicle of events in the Cornish Rebellion of 1497 was of somewhat limited value, because it was used "only as one of the very few sources of contemporary information in a particularly obscure period".

== Bibliography ==
- The entry cites:
  - J. Gairdner, Memorials of Henry VII in Rolls Series (London 1858) — For André's Life of Henry VII;
  - Gairdner, J. (1885–1900). "Andreas, Bernard" . Dictionary of National Biography. London: Smith, Elder & Co.
  - Gardiner and Mullinger, Introduction to the Study of English History (4th ed., 1903), 303, 304.
- Bernard André, The Life of Henry VII, translated and introduced by Daniel Hobbins (New York: Italica Press, 2011).
