= Hebdomadarian =

Weekly office in a monastic convent

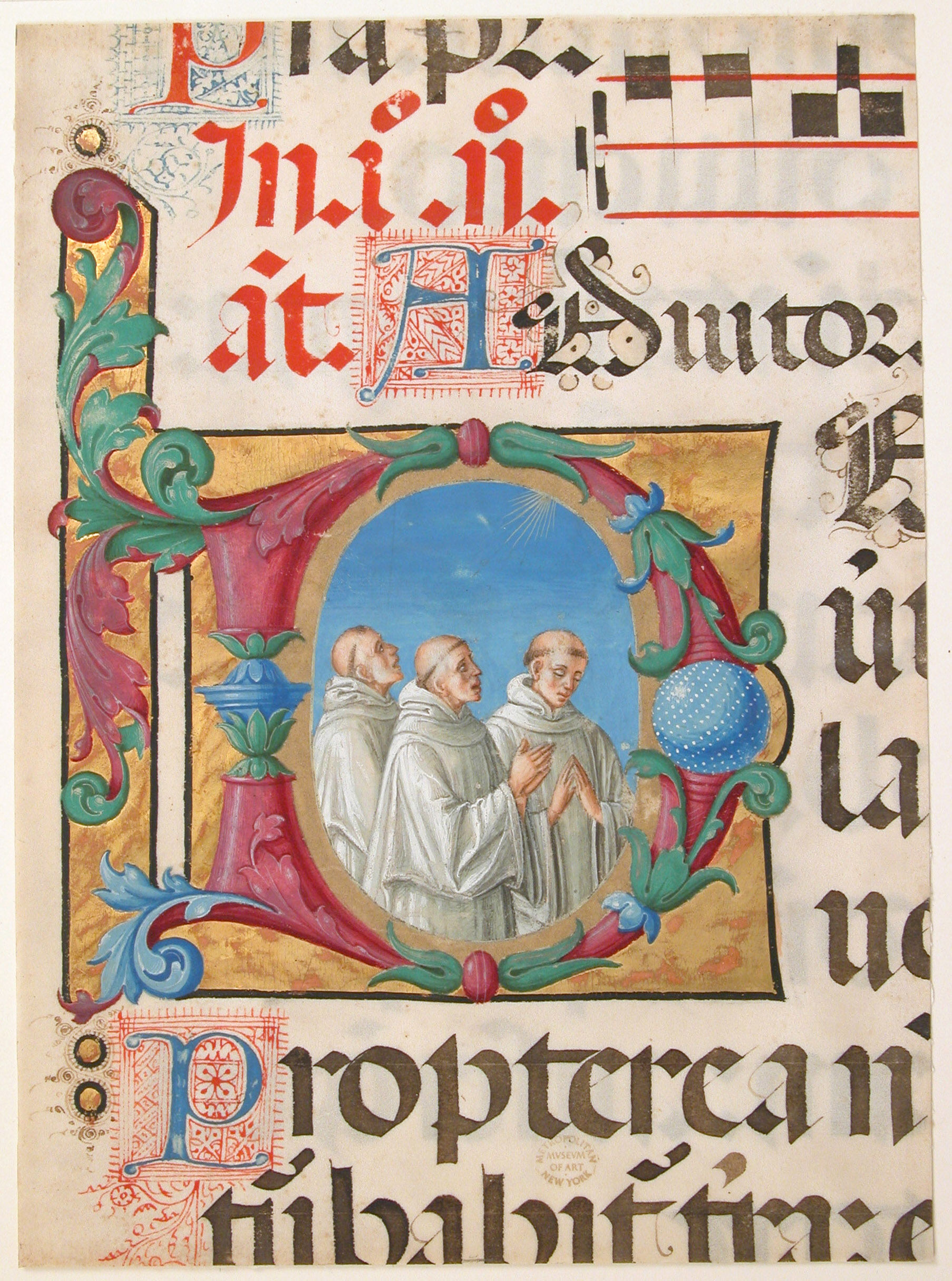
Illumination with singing monks in an Initial D

The hebdomadarian or hebdomadary (from Greek ἑβδομάς hebdomás, Latin hebdomada, "week") is a member of a monastic convent who is appointed by the superior to begin and intone those parts of the Liturgy of the hours which are to be recited by an individual for the respective week. Among them are the daily prayer, the first verse of versicles, depending on customs also hymns and antiphons, the intercessory prayer, the solemn Salve or the martyrology of the liturgical day. The hebdomadarian sings the collects and gives all the necessary blessings. He or she will open the prayer with the initial versicle: Deus in adjutorium ("O God, come to my aid").

Before the first vespers of Sunday, the hebdomadarian asks for and receives the blessing from the superior either in the choir or the chapter house.

The hebdomadarian is also the reader in the Liturgy of the Hours. In some convents, it is reserved for the superior to exercise the office of the hebdomadarian on solemnities.

The office of the hebdomadarian may derive from the Rule of Saint Benedict, who states in Chapter 38 – On the Weekly Reader:

"… let one who is to read for the whole week enter upon his office on the Lord’s day: and when he enters upon his office let him, after the Mass and Communion, beg of all prayers for himself that God avert from him the spirit of pride … let him enter upon his office of reading: and let complete silence be kept so that the whispering of none be heard there, nor the voice of any but of him only who is reading"

== Literature ==
Karl Suso Frank: Hebdomadar(in), in: Walter Kasper (ed.): Lexikon für Theologie und Kirche (3rd ed., Vol. 4)
