= R. A. Waldron =

English medievalist (born 1927)

Ronald Alan Waldron
- Born: 9 January 1927 (age 99); Teignmouth, Devon, England
- Occupation: Author
- Writing career
- Genre: Medieval literature
- Notable awards: Sir Israel Gollancz Memorial Lecture (1988)

Ronald Alan Waldron (born 9 January 1927) is an English medievalist, considered a pre-eminent expert in the field of early English literature. He wrote many books and was a lecturer at the University of Aarhus in Denmark and King's College London. He made an especial focus on the poem Sir Gawain and the Green Knight.

== Early life ==
Waldron was born and raised in Teignmouth in south Devon, attending Teignmouth Grammar School. After leaving school he worked as a clerk at Teignmouth Electric Company before being called up for national service late in World War II. After the war under the governmental Further Education and Training Scheme programme he attended the University College of the South West of England and graduated in 1951, then did postgraduate work at Royal Holloway College of the University of London, graduating in 1953. He was married to Mary (née Mary Margaret Dodd) in 1955 and they had three children. His first book, published by the Oxford University Press in 1967, was Sense and Sense Development, a non-technical work on semantics.

== Books about Ronald Alan Waldron ==
- New Perspectives on Middle English Texts: a Festschrift for R. A. Waldron

== Works written or edited by Ronald Alan Waldron ==
- Sir Gawain and the Green Knight
- The Poems of the Pearl Manuscript: Pearl, Cleanness, Patience, Sir Gawain and the Green Knight
- Medieval English Studies Presented to George Kane
- The Complete Works of the Pearl Poet
- Doublets in the Translation Techniques of John Trevisa
