= Grade II* listed buildings in Wakefield =

Significant architecture in English area

There are over 20,000 Grade II* listed buildings in England. This page is a list of these buildings in the metropolitan borough of Wakefield in West Yorkshire.

== List ==
Name	Location	Type	Completed (Note: The date given is the date used by Historic England as significant for the initial building or that of an important part in the structure's description.)	Date designated	Grid ref. (Note: Sometimes known as OSGB36, the grid reference is based on the British national grid reference system used by the Ordnance Survey.) Geo-coordinates	Entry number (Note: The "List Entry Number" is a unique number assigned to each listed building and scheduled monument by Historic England.)	Image
Church of St Cuthbert	Ackworth, Wakefield	Parish Church	15th century	25 March 1968	SE4403118076; 53°39′26″N 1°20′07″W	1313257	Church of St Cuthbert More images
Guide Post on Traffic Island at Junction with Station Road	Ackworth	Lamp Post	Later alterations	25 March 1968	SE4421017220; 53°38′59″N 1°19′58″W	1313251	Upload Photo
Quaker Meeting House with attached Lodges	Low Ackworth, Ackworth	Friends Meeting House	1847	25 March 1968	SE4414717281; 53°39′01″N 1°20′01″W	1135475	Quaker Meeting House with attached Lodges More images
The Old Hall and attached Garden Wall to Front	High Ackworth, Ackworth	House	1987	6 June 1952	SE4383618022; 53°39′25″N 1°20′17″W	1355196	The Old Hall and attached Garden Wall to Front More images
Malt House approx. 15 Metres South West of Blacker Hall Farmhouse	Great Cliff, Crigglestone	Steps	Early-mid 17th century	27 August 1986	SE3002715747; 53°38′15″N 1°32′50″W	1135604	Upload Photo
Church of All Saints	Crofton	Cross	Saxon	22 November 1966	SE3778818126; 53°39′30″N 1°25′47″W	1199946	Church of All Saints More images
Church of All Saints	Featherstone	Church	Probably C15(?)	13 March 1964	SE4218522090; 53°41′37″N 1°21′45″W	1288962	Church of All Saints More images
Grange Cottage	Featherstone	Farmhouse	16th century	9 October 1987	SE4039020936; 53°41′00″N 1°23′24″W	1135538	Upload Photo
Nostell Bridge	Huntwick with Foulby and Nostell	Road Bridge	1761	25 March 1968	SE4023917424; 53°39′06″N 1°23′34″W	1252808	Nostell Bridge More images
Obelisk Lodge and attached Screen Walls, at Se 406 18	Nostell Priory, Huntwick with Foulby and Nostell	Lodge	1776	25 March 1968	SE4067018578; 53°39′44″N 1°23′10″W	1253564	Obelisk Lodge and attached Screen Walls, at Se 406 18 More images
Church of All Saints	Normanton	Church	c. 1300	18 February 1965	SE3873722539; 53°41′52″N 1°24′53″W	1253747	Church of All Saints More images
Sharlston Hall	Sharlston	Hall House	15th century	14 February 1952	SE3956018884; 53°39′54″N 1°24′10″W	1253750	Sharlston Hall More images
Netherton Hall	Netherton	House	c. 1775	14 February 1952	SE2806116956; 53°38′54″N 1°34′37″W	1300218	Upload Photo
Winding House, Heapstead and Headstock at Caphouse Colliery	Middlestown, Sitlington	Colliery	1987	6 May 1988	SE2534116451; 53°38′38″N 1°37′05″W	1135482	Winding House, Heapstead and Headstock at Caphouse Colliery
Iron Bridge across Lake to Walton Hall	Walton Park, Walton	Gate	c. 1800	22 November 1966	SE3640016324; 53°38′32″N 1°27′03″W	1200153	Iron Bridge across Lake to Walton Hall More images
Walton Hall	Walton Park, Walton	Country House	c. 1768	11 April 1973	SE3637716255; 53°38′30″N 1°27′04″W	1135579	Walton Hall More images
Church of St Peter	Kirkthorpe, Warmfield cum Heath	Church	14th century	22 November 1966	SE3613720975; 53°41′02″N 1°27′16″W	1313216	Church of St Peter More images
Dame Mary Bolle's Water Tower including Water Wheel Housing and Overflow Channel	Heath Common, Warmfield cum Heath	Gazebo	Early-mid 17th century	27 August 1986	SE3520119974; 53°40′30″N 1°28′07″W	1200499	Dame Mary Bolle's Water Tower including Water Wheel Housing and Overflow Channel More images
Deershed in Park at Heath Hall	Warmfield cum Heath	Deer House	Early-mid 18th century	22 November 1966	SE3569320496; 53°40′47″N 1°27′40″W	1135559	Upload Photo
Heath House	Heath Common, Warmfield cum Heath	Country House	Mid 17th century	14 February 1952	SE3537820141; 53°40′36″N 1°27′57″W	1200517	Heath House More images
Stable Building/barn at Heath Hall	Heath Common, Warmfield cum Heath	Garage	Early 18th century	27 August 1986	SE3552720261; 53°40′39″N 1°27′49″W	1135584	Upload Photo
The Dower House	Heath Common, Warmfield cum Heath	House	1952	14 February 1952	SE3563320093; 53°40′34″N 1°27′43″W	1135585	The Dower House More images
Archway Lodge in Bretton Park including Flanking Walls	West Bretton	Gate Lodge	1805-6	22 November 1966	SE2894013131; 53°36′50″N 1°33′50″W	1313249	Archway Lodge in Bretton Park including Flanking Walls More images
Bretton Hall Including Attached Orangery to West	West Bretton	Country House	c. 1720	14 February 1952	SE2836612779; 53°36′39″N 1°34′22″W	1184808	Bretton Hall Including Attached Orangery to West More images
Church in Bretton Park	West Bretton	Country House	1744	22 November 1966	SE2895212896; 53°36′43″N 1°33′50″W	1135462	Church in Bretton Park More images
Stable Range in Bretton Park approx. 50 Metres North of Bretton Hall	West Bretton	Courtyard	1853	22 November 1966	SE2836712880; 53°36′42″N 1°34′22″W	1299930	Upload Photo
Woolley Hall	Woolley Park, Woolley	Country House	c. 1635	14 February 1952	SE3271013096; 53°36′48″N 1°30′25″W	1135534	Woolley Hall More images
Austin House	Wakefield	House	Late 18th century	14 July 1953	SE3266020602; 53°40′51″N 1°30′25″W	1273225	Austin House More images
Barclays Bank and attached Railings	Pontefract	House	c. 1760	29 July 1950	SE4565421917; 53°41′30″N 1°18′36″W	1313285	Barclays Bank and attached Railings More images
Boathouse at South West End of Lake in Grounds of Kettlethorpe Hall	Wakefield	Boat House	1847	14 July 1953	SE3320716518; 53°38′39″N 1°29′57″W	1258156	Boathouse at South West End of Lake in Grounds of Kettlethorpe Hall
Calder and Hebble Navigation Warehouse on River Calder opposite Thornes Lane Wharf Grid Ref Se 3368 1988	Wakefield	Warehouse	1790	30 March 1971	SE3368919871; 53°40′27″N 1°29′29″W	1242353	Calder and Hebble Navigation Warehouse on River Calder opposite Thornes Lane Wharf Grid Ref Se 3368 1988
Church of All Saints	Pontefract	Church	14th century	29 July 1950	SE4626622411; 53°41′46″N 1°18′03″W	1313269	Church of All Saints More images
Church of St Giles	Pontefract	Church	Early 18th century	29 July 1950	SE4555021898; 53°41′30″N 1°18′42″W	1135461	Church of St Giles More images
Church of St Helen	Sandal	Tower	12th century	14 July 1953	SE3435218225; 53°39′34″N 1°28′54″W	1242071	Church of St Helen More images
Church of St John the Baptist	Wakefield	Parish Church	1791-5	30 March 1971	SE3275321438; 53°41′18″N 1°30′20″W	1258554	Church of St John the Baptist More images
Church of St Joseph and attached Presbytery	Pontefract	Priests House	1806	15 November 1988	SE4522321901; 53°41′30″N 1°19′00″W	1135443	Church of St Joseph and attached Presbytery More images
Church of the Holy Trinity	Ossett	Church	1862-5	6 May 1988	SE2765421146; 53°41′10″N 1°34′58″W	1184049	Church of the Holy Trinity More images
Wakefield Mechanics' Institute	Wakefield	Museum	1820-1	30 March 1971	SE3306820923; 53°41′01″N 1°30′03″W	1259120	Wakefield Mechanics' Institute More images
Clarke Hall	Wakefield	House	Modern	14 July 1953	SE3420522116; 53°41′40″N 1°29′00″W	1260213	Clarke Hall More images
Crown Court House	Wakefield	House	1810	30 March 1971	SE3300320976; 53°41′03″N 1°30′06″W	1258996	Crown Court House More images
Theatre Royal	Wakefield	Bingo Hall	1894	1 February 1979	SE3294420740; 53°40′56″N 1°30′10″W	1258906	Theatre Royal More images
Lupset Hall	Lupset	House	1716	14 July 1953	SE3142019452; 53°40′14″N 1°31′33″W	1258152	Lupset Hall
Market Cross and attached Pump	Pontefract	Market	1734	29 July 1950	SE4555521870; 53°41′29″N 1°18′42″W	1135455	Market Cross and attached Pump More images
Milne's Orangery (Unitarian Chapel Hall)	Wakefield	Orangery	c. 1780	30 March 1971	SE3279120799; 53°40′57″N 1°30′18″W	1242123	Milne's Orangery (Unitarian Chapel Hall) More images
Old Cathedral Grammar School	Wakefield	Grammar School	1598	14 July 1953	SE3332621028; 53°41′05″N 1°29′49″W	1358639	Old Cathedral Grammar School More images
Old Town Hall	Pontefract	Statue	1785	29 July 1950	SE4567221954; 53°41′31″N 1°18′35″W	1299877	Old Town Hall More images
Red Lion Hotel	Pontefract	Hotel	1776	29 July 1950	SE4561521932; 53°41′31″N 1°18′39″W	1299813	Red Lion Hotel More images
Sandal Castle	Sandal	Castle	1328	14 July 1953	SE3372818159; 53°39′32″N 1°29′28″W	1366010	Sandal Castle More images
The Malt Shovel Public House	Pontefract	Public House	14th century	29 July 1950	SE4545421895; 53°41′30″N 1°18′47″W	1135451	The Malt Shovel Public House More images
Westgate Unitarian Chapel	Wakefield	Unitarian Chapel	Later	30 March 1971	SE3283420762; 53°40′56″N 1°30′16″W	1260218	Westgate Unitarian Chapel More images
York House	Wakefield	House	Third quarter of 18th century	14 July 1953	SE3292520789; 53°40′57″N 1°30′11″W	1242813	York House More images
138–148 Westgate	Wakefield	House	Late 18th century	14 July 1953	SE3270620624; 53°40′52″N 1°30′23″W	1258961	138–148 Westgate More images
2–24 St John's North	Wakefield	Terrace	Early-mid 19th century	14 July 1953	SE3282921502; 53°41′20″N 1°30′16″W	1258492	2–24 St John's North
53 and 55 Northgate	Wakefield	Timber Framed House	Late 15th century	12 February 1990	SE3313221000; 53°41′04″N 1°29′59″W	1272883	53 and 55 Northgate More images
136 Westgate	Wakefield	House	Late 18th century	14 July 1953	SE3272220632; 53°40′52″N 1°30′22″W	1273196	136 Westgate More images
