= Milnes' Orangery =

Historic building in Wakefield, England

Coordinates: 53°40′58″N 1°30′18″W

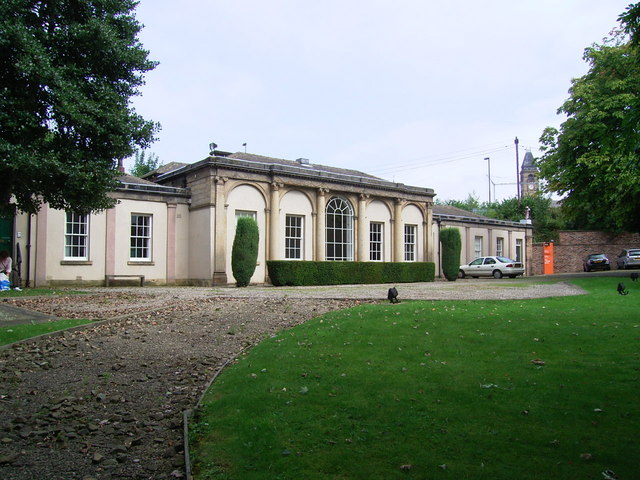
The orangery in 2008

Milnes' Orangery is a historic building in the city centre of Wakefield, in West Yorkshire, in England.

In about 1752, the cloth manufacturer Pemberton Milnes built a house on Westgate, later known as Pemberton House. In 1795, his daughter, Mary Milnes, the Dowager Viscountess of Galway, inherited the house. She had an interest in horticulture, and constructed an orangery in the garden. Milnes died in 1835, and the orangery was then leased out. In 1839, it became a small zoo with a dancing bear, then in 1842 it became a public bath.

In 1849, Daniel Gaskell inherited the house and orangery. The following year, he donated the garden to the trustees of the neighbouring Westgate Unitarian Chapel. The orangery briefly operated as a non-denominational school, but this was not successful, and it was then leased to a succession of private schools, while the gardens served as a graveyard. A lodge was constructed at the entrance to the garden.

The last school closed in 1957, and the building served as a hall for the chapel until 1996, when it was purchased by the Public Arts charity, which ran events at the venue. It later passed to Wakefield Council, and the charity moved out in 2015.

The single-storey building is in the style of Robert Adam. Its central section is five bays wide, and there are five bay wings either side. It is built of stone, partially covered in stucco. Part of the central section has large sash windows, added in the mid 19th century. The building has been Grade II* listed since 1971.

== Related articles ==
- Grade II* listed buildings in Wakefield
- Listed buildings in Wakefield
