= Listed buildings in Wakefield =

Wakefield is a city in the metropolitan district of the City of Wakefield, West Yorkshire, England. In the city and surrounding area are 195 listed buildings that are recorded in the National Heritage List for England. Of these, seven are listed at Grade I, the highest of the three grades, 18 are at Grade II*, the middle grade, and the others are at Grade II, the lowest grade. Historically a market town, it was the chief wool market in Yorkshire in the 18th century, and in the 19th century the cattle market was the largest in the north of England. The prosperity from this is reflected in the size of the parish church (now the cathedral), and in the large number of fine Georgian houses, many of which are listed.

Most of the listed buildings are houses and cottages and associated structures, shops and offices, banks, and public buildings. Also listed are the cathedral, churches and associated structures, hotels and public houses, schools, bridges, and structures in public parks. The River Calder, the Aire and Calder Navigation, and Calder and Hebble Navigation run through the south and east of the city, and items associated with them are listed. The other listed buildings include the ruins of a castle, parts of a hospital and a prison, the base of a former pump, former almshouses, a milepost, former mill buildings, a theatre, former warehouses, a monument, a statue, a war memorial, and telephone kiosks.

== Key ==
Grade	Criteria
I	Buildings of exceptional interest, sometimes considered to be internationally important
II*	Particularly important buildings of more than special interest
II	Buildings of national importance and special interest

== Buildings ==
Name and location	Photograph	Date	Notes	Grade
St Helen's Church, Sandal; 53.65941°N 1.48171°W		12th century	The church has been extended and much altered, the tower dates from the 14th century, and the nave was extended in the 19th century. The church is built in stone, and has a cruciform plan, consisting of a nave, north and south aisles, a south porch, north and south transepts, a chancel, and a tower at the crossing. The tower has three stages, a clock face on the west front, an embattled parapet, and crocketed corner pinnacles, and there are similar pinnacles on the chancel.	II*
Sandal Castle; 53.65890°N 1.49113°W		1352	The castle was rebuilt on the site of an earlier Norman castle, it was badly damaged in 1645, and is now a ruin. The remains include part of the keep, a barbican, and parts of the inner bailey. It is also a scheduled monument.	II*
Wakefield Bridge; 53.67657°N 1.48966°W		c. 1342	The bridge is in sandstone, and consists of nine pointed arches with chamfered ribs on the underside. It was widened on the west side in the 18th century with the insertion of round arches. On the east side is St Mary's Chapel.	I
St Mary's Chapel; 53.67668°N 1.48946°W		c. 1350	The chapel is on a small island in the River Calder, immediately to the east of the central arch of Wakefield Bridge. It was restored and rebuilt by George Gilbert Scott in 1848, and there have been repairs since. It is built in stone, with octagonal corner pinnacles. On the front facing the road are five narrow bays and three doorways, above which are crocketed ogee arches within ornamented gables, panels with carvings in relief, and an embattled parapet. Along the sides are three wide bays, square-headed windows, and a parapet of blind ogee arcading, and the east window has five lights. In the northeast corner is a newel staircase with a crocketed spirelet.	I
Wakefield Cathedral; 53.68302°N 1.49681°W		15th century	The cathedral, which contains some earlier material, was partly rebuilt and restored by George Gilbert Scott between 1858 and 1874, and was later extended with the addition of transepts, a sanctuary and chapel, and a chapter house designed by J. Loughborough Pearson. The cathedral is built in sandstone, and is in Perpendicular style. It consists of a nave with a clerestory, north and south aisles, a south porch, a choir, chancel, sanctuary, and chapel, north and south transepts, a chapter house, and a west steeple. The steeple has a tower with four stages, angle buttresses, an embattled parapet with corner crocketed pinnacles, and a crocketed spire. The body of the cathedral also has crocketed pinnacles and embattled parapets, and at the corners of the transepts and at the east end are pinnacled turrets.	I
53 and 55 Northgate; 53.68450°N 1.49984°W		Late 15th century	A building that was later altered and extended, it has a timber framed core, it is encased in red brick and stone and rendered, and the roofs are in slate and concrete tiles. The east front has three storeys and five bays, a central doorway with pilasters and a cornice on consoles flanked by modern shop fronts, and casement windows above. In the left return is a doorway with a cabled frieze, and at the rear are two storeys, doorways and casement windows. Inside, there is some 15th century timber framing, and the remains of a 16th century ceiling.	II*
166 Westgate; 53.68080°N 1.50739°W		Early to mid 16th century	A shop in painted brick with a slate roof, two storeys and two bays. In the ground floor is a 19th-century shop front, and a segmental-headed passage entry to the left. To the right and in the upper floor are sash windows with segmental heads.	II
57 Northgate and 2–14 Gill's Yard; 53.68445°N 1.50013°W		16th century	A shop with a former warehouse at the rear, it has a timber framed core, it is encased in red brick and stone and rendered, and has slate roofs. The shop has three storeys and two bays, a modern shop front and casement windows above. At the rear, the former warehouse has two storeys and 20th century openings. Inside the shop is some exposed timber framing.	II
162 Westgate; 53.68085°N 1.50720°W		16th century	The front of the building dates from the early to mid-18th century on an older core. The front is stuccoed, with a sill band and a slate roof. There are two storeys and two bays, and a rear wing with its gable end above the roof of the main block. In the ground floor is a 19th-century shop front and a modern casement window to the right, and the upper floor contains sash windows, paired on the left.	II
143 and 145 Westgate; 53.68065°N 1.50652°W		Late 16th century	The building is in red brick, with a stone modillion and moulded eaves cornice, and a hipped stone slate roof. There are three storeys and four bays. The windows are sashes with fluted triple keystones.	II
Old Cathedral Grammar School; 53.68471°N 1.49688°W		1598	A cross-wing was added to the former grammar school in 1895. The building is in sandstone, and has a single storey, and a main range of six bays. In the main range are five large five-light mullioned and transomed windows, and to the left is a doorway, over which is a coat of arms and a smaller five-light window. In the cross-wing is a doorway with a moulded Tudor arch and leaf carving in the spandrels.	II*
6 and 8 Silver Street; 53.68284°N 1.49965°W		Early 17th century	The building has a timber framed core, the exterior is rendered, and the roof is tiled. There are three storeys, an attic, and four bays. In the ground floor is an early 19th-century shop front with partly reeded pilasters, an entablature, and a frieze. To the right is a yard entry with wrought iron gates, above which is a shaped gable. In the upper floors, the second bay is blank, and above the middle two bays is a gabled attic. The floors contain sash windows, some top hung, and some horizontally-sliding.	II
Outbuilding to south of 274 Barnsley Road, Sandal; 53.65919°N 1.48299°W		17th century	The house, later used as an outbuilding, was extended in the 18th century. It is in stone, partly pebbledashed and painted, with a stone slate roof. There are two storeys, an inserted doorway, mullioned windows with some mullions missing, and inserted garage doors.	II
1 Shaw Fold, Sandal; 53.65980°N 1.48340°W		17th century	A stone cottage with a stone slate roof, coped gables, and kneelers. There are two storeys and two bays. In the ground floor is a four-light mullioned window, and the upper floor contains replaced sash windows.	II
3 and 5 Shaw Fold, Sandal; 53.65979°N 1.48357°W		17th century	The house, which was extended in the 18th century, is in stone with a stone slate roof. There are two storeys and a west front of six bays, the outer pairs of bays under gables. The windows are sashes, and there are two doorways. The east front is rendered and has four bays.	II
405 Milnthorpe Lane, Sandal; 53.65234°N 1.49058°W	—	17th century	A stone house that has been altered, with a stone slate roof, two storeys, and extensions on the north and west. In the northeast wall is a three-light mullioned window with a moulded surround, and the newer windows have cut voussoirs.	II
7 and 9 Woodcroft, Sandal; 53.65993°N 1.48364°W	—	17th century	A farmhouse, later extended, it is in stone, No. 7 is rendered, No. 9 has been refronted in brick, and the roof is partly in slate and partly in stone slate. There are two storeys, four bays, and later extensions. The windows are modern casements, No. 7 has a doorway with a chamfered surround and alternating block jambs, and No. 9 has a gabled porch.	II
Woodthorpe Hall; 53.64784°N 1.48565°W	—	17th century	The house, which has been altered, is in stone with a cornice band, a parapet, and a stone slate roof. There are two storeys, three bays, and an extension to the right. On the front is a prostyle Tuscan porch flanked by tripartite windows, and the other windows are sashes.	II
The Cottage; 53.64256°N 1.49691°W	—	1654	A timber framed house, later clad in stone, with some exposed timber framing. There are two storeys and three bays. Above the doorway is a dated and initialled lintel, and the windows are small casements.	II
2–6 Standbridge Lane, Sandal; 53.64971°N 1.49282°W	—	Late 17th century	A row of houses that were later altered, with quoins, and a stone slate roof. There are two storeys and three bays, the right bay blank with inserted garage doors. The doorways have monolithic jambs and heavy lintels, the windows in the upper floor are sliding sashes and the ground floor contains modern casement windows.	II
Barleywood House; 53.66064°N 1.48412°W		Late 17th century	The house, which has been altered, is pebbledashed and has a stone slate roof. There are two storeys, five bays, and a later right wing and a range at the rear. The doorway is modern with a pointed arch, and most of the windows are modern casements. At the rear is a four-light mullioned window.	II
Milnthorpe House; 53.65159°N 1.49021°W	—	Late 17th century	The house was extended with two later builds. It is in stone with a stone slate roof, the latest part with an eaves cornice and blocking course, coped gables and kneelers. There are two storeys and a cellar, and a front of three bays. In the centre is a prostyle porch with cast iron columns, and this is flanked by two-storey canted bay windows. The other windows are sliding sashes.	II
Milnthorpe Grange; 53.65202°N 1.49051°W	—	c. 1700	The house was extended in 1749, and again in about 1800, and an outbuilding was added in the 19th century. The house is in stone with a stone slate roof, hipped on the right. There are two storeys and a complex plan, with a main front of two bays. Most of the windows are sashes.	II
23 Hill Top, Newmillerdam; 53.63815°N 1.49582°W	—	Late 17th or early 18th century	A stone house with quoins and a stone slate roof. There are two storeys, four bays, and a long rear lean-to. The original doorway has monolithic jambs and a stone lintel, and a later doorway has been inserted. The upper floor windows are mullioned, with some mullions removed, the ground floor windows have been altered, and there is a small dormer.	II
The Three Houses Inn; 53.65450°N 1.48730°W		Late 17th or early 18th century	The public house is roughcast, with a stone slate roof, it has two storeys, and was built in phases. The earliest phase on the west side has two bays, and a later bay to the right, and it contains two canted bay windows. The latest two phases are at right angles to the east, and each part has four bays. The windows in all parts are sashes.	II
Walnut Cottage; 53.64988°N 1.49222°W		Late 17th or early 18th century	The house, which was altered later, is in stone, and has a stone slate roof with coped gables and kneelers. There are two storeys and three bays. On the front is a modern stone porch, to its left is an inserted bow window, and the other windows are sashes.	II
Lupset Hall; 53.66601°N 1.52411°W		1716	A country house, later used for other purposes, it is in red brick on a plinth, with stone dressings, quoins, a floor band, a frieze, a cornice and blocking course, and a hipped slate roof. There are two storeys, a front of seven bays, the middle three bays recessed, and five bays on the right return. Above the middle bay is a carved escutcheon, and a small, pedimented raised attic with a round window. In the centre of the front is a prostyle Ionic porch with an open pediment containing a medallion. The doorway has an architrave and a fanlight, and the windows are sashes with architraves.	II*
38 Westgate; 53.68257°N 1.49937°W		Early 18th century	A shop on a corner site in red brick, with quoins, and a floor band. There are three storeys and four narrow bays. The ground floor contains a doorway and three windows, all with round-arched heads and keystones. In the upper floors are sash windows with cambered heads, those in the middle floor with keystones.	II
Kettlethorpe Hall; 53.64580°N 1.49777°W		1727	A small country house in stone, with quoins, a floor band, a modillion cornice, and a parapet with scrolled sides and urn finials. There are two storeys, five bays, and flanking single-storey bays. The central doorway has pilasters, a rectangular fanlight, an initialled and dated keystone, and a serpentine open pediment. The windows are sashes, in the upper floor with architraves and carved keystones, and with entablatures and ornamental pediments in the ground floor. The central chimney stack is surrounded by columns linked by an entablature.	I
9 and 11 Bull Ring; 53.68330°N 1.49834°W		Early to mid 18th century	A house that has been altered and then a shop, it is stuccoed, and has a stone slate roof. There are three storeys and attics, and six bays. In the ground floor are modern shop fronts, and the upper floors contain sash windows with moulded architraves. In the roof are square-headed dormers with entablatures and small friezes, and the chimney stack is stuccoed, and has a cornice, and gargoyles at the corners.	II
101 and 103 Westgate; 53.68166°N 1.50339°W		Early to mid 18th century	A pair of shops in pinkish brick with a slate roof. There are two storeys and each shop has two bays. Between the shops is a round-headed passage entry, flanked by 20th-century shop fronts. The upper floor contains sash windows.	II
164 Westgate; 53.68082°N 1.50732°W		Early to mid 18th century	A house later used for other purposes, it is stuccoed, and has a tile roof. There are three storeys and three bays. In the ground floor are three elliptical arches with keystones. The right arch is a passage entry, the middle, narrower, arch is a doorway, and on the left is a shop window. The upper floors contain sash windows, those in the middle floor with segmental-arched heads.	II
Boathouse, Kettlethorpe Hall; 53.64416°N 1.49879°W		Early to mid 18th century	A garden house that was altered to a boathouse, and to accommodate the original façade of St Mary's Chapel in 1847. The boathouse has five bays, and contains a segmental-arched boat entrance with voussoirs, and the façade is above it. The façade contains doorways alternating with panels, all with ogee crocketed heads within gables. Above is a frieze and in the outer bays are niches. The façade is also a scheduled monument.	II*
17 and 17A Bread Street; 53.68274°N 1.49880°W		18th century	A pair of shops in painted brick with stone slate roofs. The older is No. 17A, with a front of five bays, the outer bays narrower and with blind windows. In the left bay is a passage entry and to the right a modern shop front. The windows are sashes under segmental brick arches. No. 17 dates from the early 19th century and has one bay. It contains a late 19th-century shop front and sash windows with flat heads.	II
30 Westgate; 53.68261°N 1.49899°W		18th century	The shop was refronted, and a storey added later. It is in red brick with stone dressings, a moulded and modillion eaves cornice, and a stone slate roof. There are four storeys and three bays. In the ground floor are modern shop fronts, the first floor contains modern windows with keystones, and in the top two floors are sash windows with stuccoed lintels.	II
105 Westgate; 53.68164°N 1.50351°W		18th century	A rendered shop with a modillion eaves cornice and a stone slate roof. There are three storeys and three bays. In the ground floor is a carriage entrance on the left, and a modern shop front. Above the shop front is a canted bay window with attached columns, a frieze, a dentilled cornice, and a wrought iron balcony. To the left is a sash window, and in the top floor are casement windows.	II
159 Westgate; 53.68047°N 1.50712°W		18th century	A house later used for other purposes, it is in painted brick, with a hipped stone slate roof. There are three storeys and seven bays. The ground floor has been altered and shop fronts inserted. In the middle floor the windows are sashes in architraves, and in the top floor they are modern casements.	II
12 Hill Top, Newmillerdam; 53.63932°N 1.49720°W	—	18th century	A rear wing was added to the farmhouse in the 19th century. The house is rendered, and has a stone slate roof with coped gables and kneelers. There are two storeys, three bays, and a later rear wing. In the angle is a porch, and the windows are replacement sashes, one in the architrave of a former doorway.	II
Wall southwest of 3 and 5 Shaw Fold, Sandal; 53.65976°N 1.48370°W	—	18th century	The garden wall to the southwest of the houses is in brick, with some stone courses at the top. It contains three doorways, two of which are blocked, and a niche.	II
Lock between navigation and river 53.67429°N 1.48201°W	—	18th century	The lock joining the Aire and Calder Navigation Old Cut and the River Calder is in stone with rounded coping. Above it is a small basin with brick walls and granite coping. The two lock gates are disused.	II
Packhorse bridge 53.67595°N 1.48948°W		18th century (probable)	The bridge carries a footpath over a former river. It is in stone and consists of three elliptical arches. The arches have architraves and impost blocks, and the bridge has a plain parapet.	II
Sandal House; 53.65945°N 1.48292°W		18th century	The house, which was extended in the 19th century, is in stone, partly pebbledashed and painted, with a stone slate roof, hipped on the left. There are two storeys, and an L-shaped plan, with an entrance front of four bays, and a later main front of five bays. The doorway has a rectangular fanlight, and a trellised porch, and the windows are sashes.	II
Sandal Vicarage; 53.65955°N 1.48229°W		18th century	The oldest part is the south wing, the east wing was added in the early 19th century, with later infill in the angle. The building is in stone with quoins, a floor band, and a stone slate roof. There are two storeys, the south front has five bays, and the east front has two. On the front is a canted bay window, the other windows are sashes, and in the later wing are Tudor arched windows and a doorway.	II
The Dam Inn; 53.63844°N 1.49795°W		18th century	The public house is in stone with quoins and a hipped stone slate roof. There are two storeys, three bays, and a linked outbuilding at the rear. The doorway has a rectangular fanlight, the windows are sashes, and there is a blocked carriage entrance in the north return.	II
The Original Alfred Moody's Public House; 53.68267°N 1.49830°W		18th century	The public house is stuccoed, on a plinth, and has a slate roof. There are two storeys and an attic, and two bays. The windows in the attic are modern. The other windows have architraves; in the ground floor they are modern casements, and in the upper floor they are original sashes.	II
Walls at entrance to Thornes Park; 53.67682°N 1.51666°W		18th century	The walls flanking the entrance to the park are in red brick, forming two quadrants. The taller central sections have a cornice and a blocking course, angle pilasters, and sunk panels in stone architraves. From these, small low walls run to end in low square piers with stone caps.	II
Wall east of Westgate End House; 53.68035°N 1.51301°W	—	18th century	The wall is in red brick with stone coping. It is on the east side of the yard to the east of the house, and extends for about 12 metres (39 ft).	II
Wall west of drive, gates and gate piers, Woodthorpe Hall; 53.64797°N 1.48639°W	—	18th century (probable)	The wall on the west side of the drive is in stone with sloped coping, the gate piers are low, square and chamfered, and the gates are in wrought iron. The drive is paved with granite blocks, and the footpath is in York stone.	II
Wall west of garden of Woodthorpe Hall; 53.64733°N 1.48585°W	—	18th century (probable)	The boundary wall is in red brick with flat coping, and is ramped down at the north to meet a stone wall with round coping. The wall curves in places and contains gateposts.	II
Westgate Unitarian Chapel; 53.68233°N 1.50437°W		1751–52	The chapel is in red brick with stone dressings, a cornice, two storeys, a front of three bays with a full-width pediment, and five bays along the sides. In the outer bays on the front are doorways with Doric entablatures, rectangular fanlights, and pediments, and between them is a Venetian window. The upper floor contains segmental-arched windows with rusticated architraves. On the roof is a bell-cupola with dome on a drum. Along the sides are Venetian windows with blind outer lights, and at the rear are round-arched windows and a lunette in the pediment.	II*
Commemorative stone, Milnes Orangery; 53.68249°N 1.50511°W	—	1752	The stone is in the burial ground of the former Unitarian Chapel Hall. It commemorates the foundation of the original chapel in 1697 and its removal to the present building in 1752.	II
Pemberton House; 53.68172°N 1.50434°W		1752–53	A house later used for other purposes, it is in light red brick, with stone dressings, a moulded eaves cornice, and a hipped stone slate roof. There are three storeys and a front of five bays. In the ground floor, the right angle has been cut away and a window inserted, and it is supported by a cast iron column. The doorway in the north front has an architrave, a fanlight, and a cornice and pediment on scrolled consoles. The windows are sashes with cambered arches.	II
21 and 23 Bread Street and 32 Westgate; 53.68270°N 1.49911°W		1769	Shops and a house in red brick with stone dressings, quoins, a coved and moulded eaves cornice, and a stone slate roof. There are three storeys, five bays on Bread Street and two on Westgate. The windows are sashes, in the ground floor are modern shop fronts, and in Bread Street is a doorway with a cornice on consoles.	II
Former Black Bull Hotel; 53.68219°N 1.50079°W		1772	The former hotel, much altered and used for other purposes, is in rendered red brick, the ground floor in terracotta, with quoins, a band, modillion eaves and pediment cornices, and a hipped roof. There are four storeys and nine bays, the middle five bays projecting under a pediment containing a blank roundel and carved foliage. The ground floor has pilasters and an entablature, it contains two doorways with Classical surrounds, and on the left is a pub front. In the upper floors, the middle bay contains a three-storey quoined recessed round arch, with a Venetian window in the first floor with Ionic colonnettes, above which is a window with swag carving below. The outer two bays contain canted bay windows. The other windows in the middle two floors are sashes with incised voussoirs and keystones, and in the top floor are two-light windows with architraves and keystones.	II
York House; 53.68259°N 1.50299°W		c. 1775	A house, later a hotel, in red brick with stone dressings, a moulded eaves cornice, and a hipped stone slate roof. There are two storeys and attics, a square plan with sides of five bays, and a two-storey kitchen wing at the northeast. In the centre of the north front is a doorway with paired pilasters, a rectangular fanlight, and a triangular pediment on shaped consoles, and the doorway on the west front has a Gibbs surround. The windows are sashes with triple keystones. In the kitchen wing is a Venetian window and a lunette.	II*
8, 10 and 12 Barstow Square and 11–15 King Street; 53.68300°N 1.50068°W		Late 18th century	The building is in red brick with stone dressings, a sill band, moulded and modillion eaves cornices and a pediment, and a stone slate roof. There are three storeys and eleven bays, with a pediment over the middle five bays containing an oval panel in an architrave. In the central bay is a recessed round arch, containing a doorway with an architrave, a rectangular fanlight, a frieze, and a cornice. Above it is a tripartite window with columns and a pediment, and in the top floor the window has an architrave. In the outer bays are two doorways with pilasters, scrolled bracketed dentilled cornices, and pediments. The windows are sashes.	II
26 Bread Street; 53.68282°N 1.49896°W		Late 18th century	The rear of a public house, it is in red brick on a stone plinth. There are three storeys and a basement, and three bays. In the central bay is a round-arched recess, two original windows are in the right bay, and the other openings have been altered.	II
23 Cross Square; 53.68285°N 1.49911°W		Late 18th century	A shop on a corner site in red brick with stone dressings, a moulded and modillion eaves cornice, and a hipped stone slate roof. There are four storeys, four canted bays, and a later bay on the right. In the ground floor is a modern shop front, The upper floors contain sash windows, those in the left four bays with fluted triple keystones.	II
19 and 21 Kirkgate; 53.68287°N 1.49536°W		Late 18th century	A house later used for other purposes, it is in red brick with stone dressings, a moulded and modillioned eaves cornice, and a hipped stone slate roof. There are three storeys and five bays. In the ground floor is a modern shop front, and the floors above contain sash windows.	II
2–10 Northgate; 53.68335°N 1.49765°W		Late 18th century	A row of shops built in four stages up to the mid 19th century. They are in red brick with stone dressings, hipped Welsh slate roofs, and three storeys. In the ground floor are modern shop fronts, and the upper floors contain sash windows. The first stage has three bays angled on the right, the second stage has four bays, and the third stage has two. The fourth stage is lower, with one bay on Northgate, two on the right return, and a curved bay on the corner; the windows in this stage have decorative surrounds.	II
136 Westgate; 53.68117°N 1.50606°W		Late 18th century	A house in red brick on a plinth, with stone dressings, a sill band, a fluted frieze, a modillion eaves cornice, and a hipped Welsh slate roof. There are three storeys and a symmetrical front of five bays. Steps lead up to a central prostyle Doric porch, with a frieze containing urns and garlands, and a pediment. The windows are recessed sashes.	II*
153 Westgate; 53.68053°N 1.50693°W		Late 18th century	A red brick house with stone dressings, a moulded frieze, an eaves cornice, and a pyramidal stone slate roof. There are three storeys and three bays. In the left bay is a recessed round-arched doorway with a wrought iron top screen, and the windows are sashes with segmental-arched heads.	II
Austin House; 53.68093°N 1.50700°W		Late 18th century	A house, later used for other purposes, in red brick with stone dressings, modillion and dentilled eaves and pediment and a tile roof. There are three storeys and nine bays, the middle five bays projecting under a pediment containing an oculus. In the centre of the ground floor is a modern showroom. To the left is a doorway with engaged fluted columns, an enriched entablature, and a pediment, and to the right is a carriage entrance. In the upper floors, the middle bay has a two-storey recessed round arch containing a Venetian window with Ionic colonnettes in the middle floor. The windows are sashes with triple keystones.	II*
Former Lloyd's Bank; 53.68260°N 1.50044°W		Late 18th century	The building, at one time a bank, is in red brick, the ground floor clad in polished granite, with stone dressings, a moulded and modillion cornice and a hipped stone slate roof. There are three storeys and eight bays. The outer bays in the ground floor contain segmental-arched passage entries with voussoirs and keystones. In the middle floor the windows in the outer bays are in Venetian style, the outer lights blind, and the other windows are sashes with triple keystones. The top floor contains square windows with keystones.	II
The Black Rock Public House; 53.68290°N 1.49894°W		Late 18th century	The front of the public house is stuccoed, and has a moulded and modillion eaves cornice, and a parapet. There are three storeys and one bay. In the ground floor is an early 20th-century pub front in Art Nouveau glazed tiles, with a wide elliptical arch and moulded and panelled pilasters. In the upper floors is a recessed round arch containing in the middle floor a Venetian window with Tuscan columns, a fluted frieze, and a dentilled cornice, and in the top floor is a casement window.	II
Locks, basin and docks, Fall Ings Lock; 53.67353°N 1.48274°W		c. 1780	The basin on the Calder and Hebble Navigation is large and elliptical, with a narrow channel on the west to three small docks. On the east is a lock. The walls are in stone with flat coping, and there are some repairs in brick.	II
67 and 69 Westgate; 53.68207°N 1.50168°W		c. 1790	Originally a bank and later used for other purposes, the building is in red brick with stone dressings, a sill band, a stone moulded and modillioned eaves cornice and a blocking course. There are three storeys and a basement, and five bays. In the ground floor is a rusticated stone arcade, and behind it in the left bay is a doorway with a fanlight and a cornice. The windows are sashes, the windows in the central bay with architraves, and that in the middle floor with a cornice on console brackets, and a pediment. The basement area is enclosed by a wall with cast iron railings.	II
Milne's Orangery; 53.68265°N 1.50498°W		c. 1790	The former orangery is in stone, partly stuccoed, with hipped slate roofs. There is a single storey, the central section has five bays, and is flanked by lower five-bay wings. The central section has engaged columns with feather capitals, a frieze with garlands and paterae, and a modillion cornice. The middle bay contains a large round-arched window, and in the other openings are sash windows. In each wing are pilasters, an entablature, and a blocking course.	II*
Warehouse on River Calder; 53.67429°N 1.49150°W		1790	A pair of warehouses on the River Calder, and later combined, they were built by the Calder and Hebble Navigation, and are in stone with stone slate roofs. There are four storeys and attics, with a front of seven bays, the outer three bays under pediments. In the centre is a round-arched rusticated arch, and above it is a recessed arch containing tripartite windows in the middle two floors and a Diocletian window at the top. The outer bays have a central segmental-arched taking-in doorway in each floor, flanking small windows, and blocked small round-headed windows in the pediments.	II*
St John's Church; 53.68841°N 1.50553°W		1791–95	The interior of the church was rebuilt in 1895–96 and the chancel was extended in 1904–05. The church is built in sandstone, the roof of the nave is in slate and the other roofs are in lead. The church consists of a nave and north and south aisles under one roof, a chancel with a south chapel and organ loft and a north vestry, and a west tower. The tower has five stages, and a west doorway with Tuscan columns, a Doric entablature, and a pediment. The second stage contains round-headed windows and blind balustrading, and in the third stage are oculi. The fourth stage contains round-headed windows flanked by paired Tuscan pilasters, and on the corners are urns. The top stage is octagonal and contains round-headed bell openings, clock faces, and a polygonal dome with a weathervane. Along the sides of the church are two tiers of windows, the lower tier blind with segmental-arched heads, and the upper tier with round-arched heads. The parapet has sections of balustrading and urns, and in the central part of the south front is an oval panel with festoons, surmounted by an urn.	II*
2–24 St John's North; 53.68903°N 1.50426°W		1795	A terrace of twelve houses in red brick on a plinth, with stone dressings, a sill band, and a modillion eaves cornice. There are three storeys, the middle five bays project under a modillion pediment, there are 22 bays to the left and 20 to the right. The doorcases are in Doric style, and vary, some have a portico with a decorated frieze and a pediment, and some have engaged columns and a frieze. The doorways have fanlights, most are semicircular, and some have double doors. The windows are sashes, those in the central five bays with keystones, in the middle floor also with balustrades. The windows in the central bay have architraves, in the middle floor also with a cornice on consoles. No. 2 has an added oriel window in the middle floor. The returns have three bays, with two-storey canted bay windows.	II*
Old Town Hall; 53.68335°N 1.50065°W		1798	The former town hall is stuccoed, and has a sill band, an impost band, and a roof of Welsh slate. There are two storeys and a basement, and seven bays. Steps lead up to the doorway that has a cornice and an inscribed blocking course. The windows are sashes, in the ground floor with nearly flat arches, and in the upper floor with round-arched heads. To the left of the doorway are wrought iron railings enclosing the basement area.	II
11–23 St John's Square and 15 Wentworth Street; 53.68873°N 1.50625°W		1799–1803	A terrace of 13 houses in red brick with stone basements, stone dressings, and a top cornice. There are three storeys and basements, the middle five bays projecting slightly under a pediment containing an oculus, and the five bays at each end also project. The windows are sashes, those in the central bay with architraves and that in the middle floor with a cornice, and one house has an added canted bay window. Steps with handrails lead up to the doorways that have rectangular fanlights. The doorcases vary; some have engaged columns, some have pilasters, and most have triangular or segmental pediments. The handrails and basement railings are in wrought iron, and at the rear are round-headed stair windows.	II
10, 12, 14, 14A, 16 and 18 Bond Street; 53.68563°N 1.50292°W		c.1800	A row of six houses on a curving site. They are in red brick, some are rendered, and the roof is slated. There are three storeys and each house has two bays. The doorways have pilasters and a rectangular fanlight, most have cornices, and one has a pediment. Most of the windows are sashes, and in No. 16 are two narrow windows in the lower floors, the window in the middle floor in a round-headed recess.	II
6 St Austin's Presbytery; 53.68690°N 1.50232°W		c.1800	A pair of houses, later a presbytery, the building is in red brick with stone dressings, a sill band, and a slate roof. There are three storeys and four bays. The doorway has Doric pilasters, an entablature, and a semicircular fanlight, and the windows are sashes.	II
2 and 4 Thompson's Yard; 53.68264°N 1.50096°W		c.1800	A house in red brick with stone dressings, a frieze, a cornice, and a stone slate roof. There are three storeys and four bays, the left bay slightly recessed. The doorway to the left has a plain surround and a fanlight, and the doorway to the right has pilasters and an entablature. In the right bay is a two-storey canted bay window, and the other windows are sashes.	II
2 and 4 Wentworth Terrace; 53.68683°N 1.50248°W		c.1800	A pair of houses at the end of a terrace, with a ground floor extension added in about 1900. They are in red brick with stone dressings and a slate roof, three storeys and four bays. The ground floor extension projects and contains a central segmental-arched doorway with Doric pilasters, and a fanlight with a keystone. Flanking this are tripartite sash windows, and over all this is a cornice with a swan-neck pediment. To the right is a similar doorway, and in the upper floors are plain sash windows.	II
65 Westgate; 53.68210°N 1.50151°W		c.1800	A house later used for other purposes, it is in red brick, the left bay painted, the rest stuccoed, with a moulded and dentilled cornice and blocking course, and a hipped stone slate roof. There are three storeys and four bays, the left bay narrower and containing a segmental-arched entry, above which are blind windows. The lower two floors of the middle bay to the right are canted, and contain a round-arched doorway with a fanlight. Above is a bay window that has engaged Tuscan columns with fluted necks and a decorated entablature, and over it is a balustraded balcony. The windows in the ground floor are round-headed, and in the upper floors they are sashes with architraves.	II
70 Westgate and 2 and 4 Cheapside; 53.68246°N 1.50116°W		c.1800	A building in a corner site in red brick, with stone dressings, a triglyph frieze under a modillion eaves cornice, and a stone slate roof. There are three storeys, two bays on Westgate and three on Cheapside. In the ground floor are modern shop fronts. The middle floor of the Westgate front contains a canted oriel window, above which are two sash windows with keystones. In the Cheapside front is a doorway with a fanlight, and sash windows with segmental heads.	II
51 and 53 Westgate End; 53.67975°N 1.51052°W		c.1800	A pair of houses in red brick with a stone slate roof, two storeys, a basement and attic, and a front of three bays. Steps lead up to a central doorway that has a fanlight, above it is a blind window, and the other windows are sashes. In the right return is a doorway and a staircase window.	II
Stone warehouse 53.67469°N 1.49155°W		c.1800	The stone warehouse has a plinth, and a Welsh slate roof with coped gables. There are four storeys, a basement and attics, nine bays on the sides, and a gabled river front of four bays. The openings include loading doors, a doorway with a segmental arch, and casement windows, and in the gable apex is a circular window.	II
Former watermill 53.67584°N 1.49194°W	—	c.1800	The former cornmill is in dark red brick with a stone slate roof. There are two storeys, three bays, and a projection in the middle bay with a lean-to slate roof. Above the doorway is a taking-in door with a platform on corbels. The openings have segmental heads, and the waterwheel is in timber and metal.	II
11 and 13 Kirkgate; 53.68287°N 1.49563°W		Late 18th or early 19th century	A pair of red brick shops, partly painted, with stone dressings, a moulded and modillioned eaves cornice, and a stone slate roof. There are three storeys and five bays. In the ground floor are modern shop fronts, and above are sash windows, the windows in the middle bay blind.	II
71 Northgate; 53.68504°N 1.50028°W		Late 18th or early 19th century	A red brick house on a plinth with stone dressings and a sill band. On the front is a top frieze and a dentilled cornice, on the sides are paired gutter brackets, and the roof is hipped and in Welsh slate. There are three storeys and a symmetrical front of five bays. In the centre is a doorcase in Classical style added in the early 20th century, and the windows are sashes.	II
Forecourt walls, 71 Northgate; 53.68507°N 1.50013°W		Late 18th or early 19th century	Across the front of the forecourt is a low brick wall with stone coping, ramped up at the ends to low square piers, each with a frieze and a cornice. There is a similar taller wall along the north side of the forecourt.	II
95 Northgate; 53.68621°N 1.50080°W		Late 18th or early 19th century	A house in red brick on a plinth, with stone dressings and stone slate roofs. The main part has a symmetrical front of two storeys with a central attic in a pediment, and three bays. The middle bay has a recessed round arch that contains a doorway with an architrave, a rectangular fanlight, a frieze with garlands, a cornice on consoles, and a pediment. This is flanked by canted bay windows. To the left is a two-storey two-bay wing containing an elliptical-arched entry in the left bay. The windows in both parts are sashes.	II
138–148 Westgate; 53.68111°N 1.50636°W		Late 18th or early 19th century	Originally two houses, later used for various purposes, they are in red brick with stone dressings, bands, a fluted frieze, a modillion eaves cornice, and a hipped stone slate roof. There are three storeys and basements, and seven bays. In the centre is a round-arched carriage entrance, and in the bay above is a recessed round arch. To its right are two 19th-century shop fronts, and in the centre on the left is a doorway with a rectangular fanlight. Elsewhere are sash windows; the windows and doorway have triple keystones. There are two entrances within the carriageway, and at the rear are tall round-headed stair windows.	II*
147 and 149 Westgate; 53.68061°N 1.50667°W		Late 18th or early 19th century	A pair of houses, later used for other purposes, in red brick with stone dressings, a fluted frieze, a moulded and dentilled eaves cornice, and a hipped Welsh slate roof. There are three storeys and six bays. Thee doorways in the outer bays have pilasters, architraves, entablatures, and rectangular fanlights. The windows are sashes with fluted triple keystones.	II
Wall and railings, 62 College Grove Road; 53.69072°N 1.49798°W	—	Late 18th or early 19th century	The low wall enclosing the forecourt is in brick with stone coping. On the wall are wrought iron railings with spike finials.	II
Grove Hall Cottage; 53.69069°N 1.49797°W		Late 18th or early 19th century	A house in red brick with a hipped slate roof. There are two storeys, two bays, and a short rear wing. The doorway has a rectangular fanlight, and the windows are sashes.	II
Orchard Cottage; 53.65758°N 1.48406°W	—	Late 18th or early 19th century	A stone house with a stone slate roof, in Gothic style. There are two storeys and two bays. In the centre is a porch, and the windows have pointed arched heads.	II
Bridge across the Owler Beck; 53.64488°N 1.49739°W	—	18th or early 19th century	The bridge carries a road over a stream in the grounds of Kettlethorpe Hall. It is in stone, and consists of a single arch. The arch is framed by three courses of brick, and has voussoir-shaped imposts. Outside each parapet is a shelf, in the centre of which is a chair-shaped stone.	II
2–9 St John's Square; 53.68799°N 1.50676°W		1801–02	A terrace of eight red brick houses with stone basements, stone dressings, bands, and a top cornice. There are three storeys and basements, the middle five bays projecting under a pediment containing an oculus, and twelve bays on each side. The windows are sashes, those in the middle floor with wrought iron balconies. Steps with handrails lead up to the doorway that have rectangular fanlights. The doorcases vary; some are plain, three have porticos with friezes and triangular or segmental pediments, and one has pilasters and an open pediment on long consoles. The handrails and basement railings are in wrought iron.	II
Former Wentworth House; 53.68687°N 1.50356°W		1802–03	A large house later used for other purposes, it is in red brick with a stone basement, a sill band, and a modillion eaves cornice. There are three storeys and a basement, and seven bays, the middle three bays projecting slightly. Five steps lead up to a central prostyle Roman Doric porch with a segmental pediment, and a doorway with an architrave, impost blocks, and a pediment. Most of the windows are sashes, with some replaced by casements.	II
Crown Court House; 53.68431°N 1.50178°W		1806–10	The court house, which was extended in 1849–50 and in 1883, is in rusticated sandstone, and in Greek Revival style. There are two storeys and a rectangular block five bays deep. At the front is a tetrastyle Doric portico, with a triglyph frieze, and a pediment containing the royal coat of arms. The central doorway is flanked by sash windows, and all have an architrave, a decorated frieze, and a cornice on consoles. Flanking the portico are single-storey wings with plain parapets, and to the south is a later recessed two-storey extension with three bays, an entablature, and a blocking course.	II*
Sandal Grange Farmhouse and farm buildings 53.65487°N 1.47437°W	—	1815	A group of buildings around a courtyard, in stone, with stone slate roofs. The north range is symmetrical, with two storeys, a middle part of five bays, flanked by two lower bays. The left part is residential, with sash windows, and the rest is stabling. In the east range is a segmental archway, a window, and two round-arched carriage doors. The south range has a single storey, and contains small rooms. The courtyard is enclosed on the west by a stone wall with round coping, and against it is a dog kennel.	II
Eastern part of main range, Stanley Royd Hospital; 53.69097°N 1.48845°W		1818	Built as a pauper lunatic asylum, later a hospital, and then converted for residential use. It is in white brick with stone dressings and a Welsh slate roof. There is an H-shaped plan, and it consists of a central entrance range with four storeys, flanked by three-storey wings ending in four-storey pavilions, and at the crossing-points are four-storey octagons. The building has a stone plinth, sill bands, and an eaves cornice. The entrance range is pedimented, and on the roof is a cupola with an octagonal base, Roman Doric columns, an entablature, a dome, and a weathervane.	II
Former ventilating tower 53.69058°N 1.48907°W		1818	The ventilation tower was built for the former Paupers' Lunatic Asylum. It is in white brick, with projecting stone bands and a capstone. There are two openings, one blocked, the other with a metal grille.	II
Former City Museum; 53.68376°N 1.50082°W		1820–21	Originally a mechanics' institution and at one time a museum, the building is in sandstone on a plinth, the ground floor rusticated, with a hipped Welsh slate roof. There are two tall storeys on the front, and five bays. Over the ground floor is a band, on which are Ionic half-columns between the bays and paired pilasters at the ends carrying an entablature with a lettered frieze. The windows are sashes, those in the upper floor with architraves, cornices, and apron panels. The rear is stuccoed and has two storeys, a basement, and a mezzanine. In the centre and at the south end are bow windows.	II*
Margaret Street Clinic; 53.68679°N 1.50539°W		1822–23	A house, later used for other purposes, in red brick on a stone plinth, with stone dressings, angle pilasters, a floor band, a cornice and blocking course, and a hipped roof. There are two storeys, five bays on the front, and four on the sides. Steps lead up to a central prostyle porch with square outer piers, Ionic inner columns, and a pediment. The windows are sashes, those in the upper floor with apron panels.	II
11 Market Street; 53.68170°N 1.50017°W		1823	A house, extended in about 1870, and later used for other purposes, it is in red brick, partly rendered, on a plinth, with stone dressings, a sill band, and hipped roofs. On the south front, the original wing to the right has a single storey, and contains a canted bay window and a French window. To the left is a two-storey block with four bays, and it contains sash windows. On the Market Street front is a recessed doorway with a fanlight.	II
Bridge over Ings Beck; 53.67831°N 1.50021°W		1825	The bridge carries Denby Dale Road (A636 road) over Ings Beck. On the east side is a low stone parapet with wide round coping, and a dated milestone in the centre. Over the water is a segmental arch with voussoirs, a keystone, and a band. On the west side, only the parapet remains; the rest has been built over.	II
19 Bread Street; 53.68273°N 1.49893°W		Early 19th century	A shop in red brick with a stone slate roof, three storeys and one bay. In the ground floor is a 19th-century shop front with narrow pilasters, a reeded architrave with paterae, a frieze, and a cornice. The upper floors contain wide sash windows.	II
9 Cheapside; 53.68262°N 1.50168°W		Early 19th century	A wool-stapler’s warehouse, later used as offices, in brick with some sandstone, eaves gutters with decorative cast iron corbels, and a stone flag roof. There are three storeys and five bays. The middle bay contains a loading door in each floor, the top one with a balcony. The windows are sashes with sandstone sills, those in the left two bays with flat brick arched heads, and those in the right two bays with segmental-arched heads.	II
11 Cheapside; 53.68273°N 1.50187°W		Early 19th century	A wool-stapler’s warehouse, later used as offices, in brown brick with some sandstone, and a slate roof. There are three storeys and three bays. In the ground floor of the middle bay is a doorway, above are segmental-headed loading doors, and at the top is a projecting hoist beam. Most of the windows are replacement casements, there are two remaining sashes, and the windows in the upper two floors have segmental heads. On the extreme right is a narrow doorway.	II
13 Cheapside; 53.68280°N 1.50201°W		Early 19th century	A wool-stapler’s warehouse, later used for other purposes, in red brick, partly painted, with some sandstone, and a tile roof. There are three storeys and five bays. The middle bay contains a loading door in each floor, the windows in the ground floor are replacement horizontally-sliding sashes, and those in the upper floors are casements. All the openings have segmental-arched brick heads.	II
15 and 17 Cheapside; 53.68293°N 1.50224°W		Early 19th century	A wool-stapler’s warehouse, later used for other purposes, in red brick, with some sandstone, and a slate roof. There are three storeys, and two units, each of four bays. In the third bay of each unit is a loading door in each storey, those in the upper two floors with balconies, and at the top is a projecting hoist beam. The windows are sashes, in the left bay of the right unit the ground floor window has been converted into a doorway, and all the openings have segmental-arched brick heads.	II
19 Cheapside; 53.68308°N 1.50250°W		Early 19th century	A warehouse, later used for other purposes, in red brick with a stone slate roof, four storeys and seven bays. In the middle bay is a doorway and loading doors in the upper floors. The windows are sashes, and all the openings have segmental-arched heads.	II
203 and 205 Flanshaw Lane; 53.68243°N 1.53180°W	—	Early 19th century	A pair of stuccoed cottages with a stone slate roof. There are two storeys, five bays, and a long rear lean-to. The doorways have pilasters, entablatures, rectangular fanlights and side lights, and the windows are recessed sashes.	II
17 Kirkgate; 53.68287°N 1.49549°W		Early 19th century	A shop in red brick with stone dressings, a frieze, a moulded eaves cornice, and a Welsh slate roof. In the ground floor is a modern shop front, and above are sash windows with voussoirs.	II
87–93 Northgate; 53.68600°N 1.50069°W		Early 19th century	A terrace of four houses in red brick, with a moulded eaves cornice, and a stone slate roof. There are three storeys and basements, and nine bays. The doorways have a reeded architrave, a rectangular fanlight, a patterned frieze, and a bracketed cornice, and all but No. 93 have a pediment. The windows are sashes, and in the roof of No. 89 are three pedimented dormers.	II
158 Northgate; 53.68906°N 1.50244°W		Early 19th century	A house that was later extended to the south and used for other purposes. It is in red brick on a stone plinth, with a moulded stone eaves cornice, and a hipped slate roof. There are two storeys, and the original range and the extension both have three bays. Steps lead up to the doorway in the centre of the original range that has engaged columns, an entablature and a blocking course, and the windows are sashes.	II
1 and 3 Marygate; 53.68263°N 1.49928°W		Early 19th century	A pair of shops in red brick with modern shop fronts. No. 1 on the left has a hipped stone slate roof, three storeys and three bays. The windows in the top floor are sashes with segmental heads, and in the middle floor they are casements. No. 3 has two storeys, two bays, and a slate roof, and the windows are fixed.	II
97 and 99 Northgate; 53.68637°N 1.50084°W		Early 19th century	A pair of houses in red brick, with a stone slate roof, two storeys and seven bays. The middle bay contains a round-arched passage entry, and above it is a blind window. In the centre of each house is a doorway with an architrave, a rectangular fanlight, a patterned frieze, a cornice on consoles, and a pediment, and the windows are sashes.	II
7 Tammy Hall Street; 53.68366°N 1.50114°W		Early 19th century	The building is in red brick with a stuccoed ground floor, an eaves cornice, and a hipped slate roof. There are two storeys and a basement, three bays, and the windows are sashes. The doorway and the ground floor windows have architraves and round-arched heads, the doorway has a fanlight, and between them is an impost band. The windows in the top floor have square heads.	II
14–22 Westgate; 53.68263°N 1.49855°W		Early 19th century	A row of shops in red brick, with a moulded eaves cornice, partly dentilled, and a slate roof. There are three storeys and eight bays, the fifth bay curved, and the right three bays recessed. In the ground floor are modern shop fronts, and the upper floors contain windows with fluted keystones, mostly sashes, some replacement casements, and two blind windows.	II
111 and 113 Westgate; 53.68152°N 1.50387°W		Early 19th century	A pair of shops in red brick with a modillion eaves cornice and a hipped slate roof. There are three storeys and five bays. In the ground front is a central passage entry flanked by 19th-century shop fronts. In the upper floors, the central bay has a recessed round-headed arch, the windows in the middle floor are sashes, and in the top floor they are replacements.	II
4 and 6 Westmorland Street; 53.68339°N 1.49724°W		Early 19th century	A private house, later a public house and a shop, with slate roofs. The public house is stuccoed, and has three storeys and five bays. In the ground floor is a modern pub front, and the upper floors contain sash windows. To the right is a shop in brick, with two storeys and one bay, containing a shop front and a sash window.	II
8 Westmorland Street; 53.68335°N 1.49703°W		Early 19th century	A house, later used for other purposes, it is in red brick with a Welsh slate roof. There are three storeys and five bays. In the ground floor is a round-arched entry, and a modern shop front to the left, and the upper floors contain sash windows.	II
2 Agbrigg Road, Sandal; 53.66189°N 1.48395°W		Early 19th century	A stone house with a stone slate roof, hipped on the right. There are two storeys, two bays, and a slightly recessed bay on the right. The windows are sashes with heavy ridged lintels and wide sills, and in the upper floor of the right bay is a circular window. The doorway has a rectangular fanlight, and attached to the left wall is a gate pier.	II
4 Agbrigg Road, Sandal; 53.66197°N 1.48376°W		Early 19th century	A stone house with a stone slate roof, hipped on the right. There are two storeys, and three bays, the right bay projecting slightly. The doorway has a rectangular fanlight, and the windows are sashes.	II
6 Agbrigg Road, Sandal; 53.66206°N 1.48363°W		Early 19th century	A stone house with a stone slate roof, two storeys, and three bays. The central doorway has a rectangular fanlight, and the windows are sashes with shallow segmental-arched heads.	II
Stable south of 17 Castle Road, Sandal; 53.65887°N 1.48431°W		Early 19th century	The stable of a demolished house is in stone with a stone slate roof. There are two storeys, and an L-shaped plan, with a main range of four bays, and a wing at right angles. On the front facing the road is an elliptical carriage arch with quoins and voussoirs, and windows under the eaves. On the other fronts are segmental-arched carriage entries and smaller openings.	II
401 Milnthorpe Lane, Sandal; 53.65231°N 1.49080°W	—	Early 19th century	A stone house with quoins and a stone slate roof. There are two storeys, five bays, and a projecting outbuilding on the left. The windows are modern casements.	II
Hatfeild Villa; 53.68790°N 1.49868°W		Early 19th century	A stone house with paired gutter brackets and a hipped stone slate roof. There are two storeys and a basement, and a symmetrical front of three bays. The central doorway has a pediment on console brackets, and the windows are sashes with stuccoed lintels and sills.	II
Former Board Room; 53.67755°N 1.48899°W		Early 19th century	The former board room of the Aire and Calder Navigation company is in stone with a hipped slate roof. There is a single storey, and a symmetrical front of five bays. In the centre is an entrance with Tuscan columns in antis and a pediment, and the outer bays contain sash windows.	II
St John's Lodge; 53.68944°N 1.50279°W		Early 19th century	A house, later used for other purposes, it is in red brick, with stone dressings, a moulded eaves cornice, and a hipped slate roof. There are two storeys, three bays, a recessed bay on the left, and a single-storey bay on the right. The central doorcase has engaged columns with fluted necking, and an entablature with a fluted frieze and a pediment, and the doorway has an architrave, a fanlight, and impost blocks. The windows are sashes with flat heads.	II
Thornes Pump; 53.66914°N 1.50478°W		1827	The pump was built over an old well, and the superstructure has been removed, leaving only the plinth. This is in sandstone, with an octagonal plan. On the sides are hollowed-out troughs and sunk panels.	II
Westgate Wesleyan Methodist Church; 53.67978°N 1.50996°W		1827	The church is in red brick with stone dressings. There are two storeys, with five bays on the front, the middle three bays bowed under a pedimented gable, and sides of five bays. The upper floor has an entablature, and the central bay is flanked by Ionic pilasters. The ground floor windows have flat heads and keystones, and those in the upper floor are taller with round heads and aprons. The central doorway dates from about 1870, and has Corinthian pilasters, and an archivolt-headed fanlight.	II
St Austin's Church, parish hall, wall, railings and gate piers 53.68698°N 1.50204°W		1827–28	The original design of the church was by Joseph Ireland, and it was later altered and extended, including additions made by Joseph Hansom in 1878–80. The church is in red brick with stone dressings, and roofs of lead and slate. It consists of a nave, a porch, a semi-octagonal Lady Chapel with a lead dome and a cross finial, a sanctuary, a baptistry, and a sacristy. Attached to the church at a right angle is the parish hall. Along the boundary of the church is a low brick wall with stone copings and cast iron railings, and there are sets of gate piers with segmental-headed caps.	II
St James' Church, Thornes; 53.67291°N 1.50205°W		1829–30	The chancel was added to the church in 1844. The church is built in stone, and consists of a nave, a chancel, and a west tower rising from the west bay of the nave. The tower is square and has an octagonal drum and a dome. The body of the church has a frieze and an eaves cornice, and the doors and windows are square-headed with architraves and cornices. At the east end is a pediment, and a blank tripartite window with a Doric entablature.	II
The Wakefield Arms; 53.67892°N 1.48994°W		c. 1830	The public house on a corner site is in red brick rendered in Portland cement, the ground floor is rusticated, there is a sill band and a roof of artificial slate. The public house has three storeys, five bays on the front, three on the right return, and a canted bay between, and there is a single storey addition on the right. In the centre of the front are double doors with pilasters, a fanlight, and an entablature. Most windows are sashes with moulded surrounds, and in the corner bay is a casement window. Between the top two floors and on the corner are name boards.	II
Queen Elizabeth Grammar School; 53.68849°N 1.50136°W		1833–34	The school was designed by Richard Lane, and is in stone. It has a symmetrical front, the central bay being the tallest, and flanked by octagonal towers with embattled parapets. It contains a doorway and a large window, both with Tudor arches, at the top is a gable containing a clock face, and it is flanked by narrow bays with lancet windows. At the ends are projecting bays with raised parapets containing shields, and large two-tiered mullioned and transomed windows. Between these are four-bay ranges with basements, also containing mullioned and transomed windows.	II
Front wall and railings, Queen Elizabeth Grammar School; 53.68830°N 1.50189°W		c. 1834	Along the front of the school grounds is a grooved stone wall with rounded coping. This carries cast iron railings with crocketed tracery and trefoil heads. There are gates at the centre and the ends.	II
Lodge, Queen Elizabeth Grammar School; 53.68807°N 1.50157°W		c. 1834	The lodge at the entrance to the school grounds is in stone with a parapet rising to a pediment shape and containing blank shields. There is one storey and an L-shaped plan. The doors and windows have Tudor arched heads, and there are half-octagonal embattled turrets concealing the chimneys.	II
Bank House; 53.68401°N 1.50284°W		1834	Originally a bank, later used for other purposes, it is in stone and in Greek Revival style. There are two storeys, and a front and sides of three bays. At the angles are giant pilasters, and flanking the middle bay are three-quarter columns, all in Ionic style. The central doorway has an architrave, a rectangular fanlight, and a pediment on long scrolled console brackets. The windows are sashes, the window above the doorway with an architrave, and the ground floor windows with architraves and cornices on consoles.	II
62 George Street; 53.68038°N 1.50076°W		Early to mid 19th century	A red brick house on a plinth, with stone dressings, alternating quoins, a band, a modillion cornice, and a slate roof. There are three storeys and four bays. Double steps with a wrought iron handrail lead up to the doorway in the third bay. The doorway has a Roman Doric doorcase and a fanlight, and the windows are sashes. The windows in the ground floor and the doorway have friezes and modillion cornices, and in the upper floors the windows have wedge lintels incised as voussoirs.	II
1–4 South Parade; 53.68018°N 1.49860°W		Early to mid 19th century	A terrace of four houses in red brick with stone dressings, a floor band, a moulded and dentilled eaves cornice, and a slate roof. There are three storeys and basements, No. 1 has five bays and the other houses have three each. No. 1 has a Tuscan porch, a rectangular fanlight, and a first floor cast iron balcony. The fanlights in the other houses are semicircular, Nos. 2 and 4 have engaged columns and an entablature, and No. 3 has an architrave and a cornice. = The windows are sashes, those in Nos. 2–4 with keystones.	II
5, 5A, 6–12 and 14A South Parade and 37A, 39A and 41A George Street; 53.68030°N 1.49727°W		Early to mid 19th century	A terrace of houses of differing builds, in red brick with stone dressings, cornices, some dentilled, and slate roofs. The houses have three storeys and basements, some have three bays, and others have five. Two houses have porches with balconies, one Tuscan, the other Ionic. Most of the other houses have semicircular fanlights, some with Tuscan doorcases with triangular or segmental pediments. The windows are sashes with flat, or nearly flat, brick arches.	II
24 Trinity Church Gate; 53.68048°N 1.49479°W		Early to mid 19th century	A red brick house on a plinth, with stone dressings, a band, paired eaves brackets, and hipped slate roofs. There are two storeys, a symmetrical front of three bays, and flanking recessed single-bay wings. Steps lead up to the central round-headed doorway that has a stuccoed surround, an architrave, impost blocks, a semicircular fanlight, and a cornice, and the windows are sashes.	II
15A Wentworth Street; 53.68905°N 1.50569°W		Early to mid 19th century	A red brick house with stone dressings and a hipped stone slate roof. There are two storeys and three bays. The windows are sashes with stone sills and canted arches.	II
60 and 62 Westgate; 53.68251°N 1.50081°W		Early to mid 19th century	A pair of shops in red brick, partly painted, with a moulded stone eaves cornice and a slate roof. There are three storeys and five bays, the left bay slightly lower, and containing an elliptical-arched passageway. To the right in the ground floor are modern shop fronts, and the upper floors contain sash windows.	II
72 and 74 Westgate; 53.68238°N 1.50137°W		Early to mid 19th century	A pair of houses, at one time a bank, and later used for other purposes, the building is in red brick, the ground floor is in stone, and at the top are triglyph friezes, stone modillion eaves courses, and stone slate roofs. There are three storeys, and each former house has two bays. In the ground floor is a 20th-century office front, and the upper floors contain replaced sash windows.	II
220 Doncaster Road, Agbrigg; 53.66906°N 1.47590°W	—	Early to mid 19th century	A stone house with a sill band, a stepped and moulded eaves cornice, and a hipped slate roof. There are two storeys, three bays, and a recessed left wing. In the centre is a prostyle Tuscan porch, and the windows are sashes.	II
Cliff Field House; 53.68516°N 1.50550°W		Early to mid 19th century	A red brick house on a stone plinth, with a moulded stone cornice on the front, and a hipped slate roof. There are two storeys, a square plan, and a symmetrical front of five bays. In the centre is a Tuscan doorcase with a pediment, and the doorway has a moulded architrave, impost blocks, and a semicircular fanlight. The windows are sashes with flat brick arches.	II
Westfield House and Westfield Lodge; 53.69289°N 1.49533°W		Early to mid 19th century	The house is in red brick on a plinth, with stone dressings, a floor band, and a hipped slate roof. There are two storeys, five bays, and a recessed bay on the right. The middle bay is in rusticated stone, with a guilloché moulded border. It contains a porch with Ionic columns, and a doorway with a fanlight. The windows are sash windows with aprons, those in the upper floor with pilasters and consoles.	II
11–25 George Street; 53.68081°N 1.49512°W		1838	A row of almshouses in stone with green slate roofs and tall cylindrical chimney pots. It consists of a central two-storey gabled section flanked by single-storey wings and a short gabled wing on the right to the rear. The central section has a doorway flanked by windows, and three windows above, all with hood moulds. In the gable is an inscribed and dated plaque, and the gable has kneelers and a corbelled finial. In each wing are three doorways, each with a two-light windows, and all with hood moulds, and the windows are sashes with segmental pointed arches. The gables at the ends and rear have decorative pierced bargeboards, and contain quatrefoils.	II
Floodlock gates and overbridge 53.68651°N 1.46746°W		c. 1839	The bridge carries a track over the Aire and Calder Navigation. It consists of a single elliptical arch win stone with brick vaulting. At the base of the parapet is a moulded band, and flanking the arch and at the ends are pilaster buttresses. The canal is narrowed under the bridge, where there is a pair of lock gates.	II
18 Rishworth Street; 53.68526°N 1.50151°W		c. 1840	A house, later used for other purposes, it is in red-brown brick with a Welsh slate roof, two storeys and three bays. The central doorway has pilasters, a fanlight, a frieze, and a cornice. The windows are sashes with slightly cambered heads.	II
20 Rishworth Street and 2 Laburnum Road; 53.68519°N 1.50165°W		c. 1840	Two houses on a corner site, they are in red-brown brick with a Welsh slate roof, hipped on the corner. There are two storeys, and three bays on each front. In the centre of each front is a doorway with pilasters, a fanlight, a frieze, and a cornice. The windows are sashes with slightly cambered heads.	II
Thorne's Locks; 53.66543°N 1.50563°W		c. 1840	The double locks between the Calder and Hebble Navigation and the River Calder have a central island. They are in stone and granite blocks, and the southern lock is no longer in use.	II
2–8 Castrop-Rauxel Square; 53.68479°N 1.50142°W		1840–41	A terrace of four houses in red brick, the ground floor in rusticated stucco, with an eaves cornice, and a slate roof. There are three storeys, each house has two bays, and the end houses project slightly. Steps with handrails lead up to the doorways that have rectangular fanlights. The windows in the middle floor are casements with cast iron balconies, and in the top floor are sash windows.	II
Glad Tidings Hall; 53.68048°N 1.50029°W		1843–44	Originally a Baptist chapel, the building is in red brick with stone dressings. There are two storeys and an attic, and a front of three bays. Steps lead up to doorways in the outer bays that have architraves and cornice hoods on brackets. Above are Tuscan pilasters, an entablature, and a raised parapet with scrolled abutments, a small pediment, and acroteria. The windows have flat brick arches and stone sills.	II
Central and administrative blocks, walls and pavilions, HM Prison; 53.68348°N 1.50920°W	—	1843–47	The prison buildings are in stone. The central block has one tall storey and is in the form of a triumphal arch, with a Doric entablature. In the recessed centre are two columns flanking a doorway, over which are voussoirs and a vermiculated keystone. Walls at the rear connect with the administrative blocks that have three storeys, a double-pile plan, and five bays. From the north and south blocks, walls run in segmental curves to small pavilions.	II
Former Zion United Reformed Church and Lodge; 53.68081°N 1.49716°W		1844	The church, later converted for residential use, is in stone. There is one tall storey and a basement, five bays on the front, and seven on the sides, with pilasters between the bays. The church has an entablature, a frieze with medallions, a bracketed cornice, and a parapet with a raised pedimented centre inscribed with the name of the church. In the centre of the front is a doorway with an architrave, a pulvinated frieze, a cornice, and a pediment. The main windows are tall with round-arched heads, and in the basement are sash windows. Attached to the northeast is a lodge with one storey and a basement, and a hipped slate roof.	II
Alcove east of 236 Barnsley Road, Sandal; 53.66058°N 1.48391°W		1845	The alcove consists of a small square gabled stone building with the date in the gable apex. It has a Tudor arched opening, corner piers with pyramidal tops, and a frieze with blank shields.	II
Church of St Andrew and St Mary; 53.68270°N 1.48963°W		1845–46	The church was designed by George Gilbert Scott in Early English style, and is built in sandstone with freestone dressings and slate roofs. It consists of a nave with north and south aisles, a lower chancel with a north vestry and later extensions. In the west front is a doorway with a pointed arch, on the gable is a gabled bellcote.	II
Urban Studies Centre; 53.67951°N 1.49481°W		1846	A Methodist Sunday school, later used for other purposes, it is in stone on a plinth, with quoins, a cornice, a parapet, and slate roofs. There is one storey, a front of five bays, the middle bay wider with a pediment containing an inscribed and dated plaque, and sides of three bays. The windows are sashes with cornices on brackets, the middle window on the front tripartite.	II
Working men's monument 53.68239°N 1.50486°W		1850	The monument is in the grounds of Milne's Orangery, it commemorates the good works of John Horner junior, and was paid for by 999 inhabitants of the town. It is in stone, and consists of a broken column on a tall plinth with an inscribed panel.	II
1 Tammy Hall Street; 53.68354°N 1.50091°W		Mid 19th century	The building is in stuccoed stone, and in Italianate style. The ground floor is rusticated, and there are bands, and a hipped stone slate roof. The building has three storeys, and fronts of three and four bays, and the windows are sashes. In the ground floor, the windows and doorways have round-arched heads. In the middle floor the windows have pediments on consoles and aprons, and in the top floor they are smaller, with impost bands.	II
3 Wentworth Terrace; 53.68718°N 1.50260°W		Mid 19th century	A house, at one time used for other purposes, it is in stone on a plinth, with a floor band, a deep eaves soffit, and a hipped slate roof. There are two storeys and three bays. Steps lead up to a central doorway with a prostyle Tuscan porch and a rectangular fanlight. This is flanked by square bay windows with tripartite sashes, and in the upper floor are three sash windows with plain lintels.	II
24–28 Westgate; 53.68263°N 1.49882°W		Mid 19th century	A pair of shops in red brick, with a stone slate roof, three storeys and four bays. In the ground floor are modern shop fronts, and the upper floors contain sash windows with cambered arches.	II
Castle Mount; 53.66128°N 1.48886°W		Mid 19th century	A stone house with a floor band, an eaves cornice, and a slate roof. There are two storeys, three bays, and extensions on the right. In the centre is a prostyle Ionic porch, and a doorway with pilasters, an architrave, impost blocks, and a radial fanlight. The windows are sashes with architraves, friezes, and cornices.	II
Railings, Wakefield Cathedral; 53.68328°N 1.49716°W		19th century	Along the northern boundary of the cathedral grounds is a low stone plinth carrying cast iron railings with curved cruciform standards. There are cast iron stays and urn finials at intervals.	II
Entrance block, Kirkgate Station; 53.67872°N 1.48931°W		1854	The entrance block is in stone, and in Italianate style. It has a central bay with steps leading up to an entrance that has a segmental pediment, over which is a clock and a pediment. This is flanked by four single-storey bays, and at the ends are three-bay pavilions with hipped roofs. The windows in the outer bays either have cornices or segmental pediments. In front of the bays to the left of the entrance is a canopy.	II
Former United Methodist Chapel; 53.68141°N 1.50042°W		1858	The chapel, later used for other purposes, is in red brick with stone dressings, and quoins. There is a front of five bays, and six bays on the sides. On the front are four giant Corinthian pilasters, an entablature, and a pediment. In the right bay, steps lead up to a doorway with a segmental pediment, the window in the left bay also has a segmental pediment, and the central window has a plain architrave. The windows in the upper floor have segmental heads, architraves, a keystone, and an impost band.	II
Theatre, Stanley Royd Hospital; 53.69095°N 1.48971°W		1859	Originally a dining room, it was extended in 1893, and later used as a theatre and then a church. The building is in grey brick with a parapet, and slate roof with a pedimented gable containing a datestone. There is one storey and nine bays, and inside is a surviving Victorian stage.	II
49 King Street; 53.68385°N 1.50246°W		1863	An office in stone on a plinth, with a band, a top entablature and a blocking course. There are two storeys and a basement, five bays on the front, one bay in the left return and an angled bay on the corner. In the angled bay is a doorway with engaged Tuscan columns and an entablature, and the windows are sashes with moulded surrounds.	II
Milepost opposite 34 Aberford Road; 53.69246°N 1.48551°W		Mid to late 19th century	The milepost is on the west side of Aberford Road (A642 road). It is in stone with cast iron overlay, and has a triangular plan and a rounded top. On the top is inscribed "WAKEFIELD & ABERFORD ROAD" and "WAKEFIELD", and on the sides are the distances to Aberford, Wakefield, and Oulton.	II
Sunny Lawns; 53.68568°N 1.50571°W		c. 1870	A house, later used for other purposes, in red brick with stone dressings, a frieze and a cornice in both storeys, and an eaves soffit. There are two storeys, three bays, the middle bay narrower and recessed, and a later recessed left bay. The central porch has two columns, and the windows are ashes, those in the outer bays of the upper floor with arcaded balconies.	II
Forecourt walls, Sunny Lawns; 53.68579°N 1.50570°W	—	c. 1870	The wall along the north side of the forecourt is in red brick. In front of the forecourt is a low stone wall with a pair of gate piers to the right.	II
Rutland Mill; 53.67529°N 1.49074°W		1871	The mill buildings, later used for other purposes, are in red brick, with details in polychromatic brick, and Welsh slate roofs. They include carding sheds to the east on Bridge Street, with ten blind round arches, a side front on Tootal Street with two storeys, a spinning mill with four storeys and sides of twelve and six windows and stair towers, an office range with three storeys and ten windows, and on the west is a bridge linking to a warehouse with three storeys. In the courtyard is a dyehouse and the stump of an octagonal chimney.	II
1–13 Wentworth Street and 1 St John's Square; 53.68786°N 1.50468°W		Late 19th century	Three pairs of red brick houses with stone dressings, each with a frieze, a cornice, and a hipped Welsh slate roof. There are three storeys, and each house has one bay facing the road and three bays on the return. Facing the road is a canted bay window, in the return is an Ionic doorcase, and the windows are sashes.	II
Cliff Hill House; 53.68598°N 1.50580°W		Late 19th century	A red brick house on a high stone plinth, with stone dressings, a floor band, a deep bracketed eaves soffit, and a hipped slate roof. There are two storeys and three bays, the middle bay recessed, and a lower two-storey three-bay wing on the left. In the centre is a recessed porch with four square columns, and a doorway with a fanlight, above which is a balcony with wrought iron railings, and a three-window arcade. The other windows are sashes, double in the right bay.	II
Gate piers and gates, St Helen's Church; 53.65910°N 1.48241°W		Late 19th century	At the western entrance to the churchyard are square gate piers with cusped panels and gabled tops. Between them are double and single ornate wrought iron gates, and an overthrow with a lamp holder.	II
National Westminster Bank; 53.68253°N 1.50062°W		Late 19th century	The bank building is in stone, the ground floor clad in grey granite. It has a sill band with triglyph brackets, a modillion cornice, and a parapet. There are three storeys and four bays. The windows in the upper floors have architraves, and those on the middle floor also have a frieze and a dentilled cornice.	II
Unity House; 53.68196°N 1.50216°W		1876–78	A department store that was extended in 1899–1902 and since used for other purposes, it is in red brick with sandstone dressings and slate roofs, and has three storeys and attics. In the ground floor are modern shop fronts. The earlier part facing Smythe Street has a block of nine bays under two partly stepped gables, and a further three bays to the right with a curved gable. The entrance has a segmental arch, a carved keystone, and a balcony on brackets, and it contains ornate wrought iron gates. The later front facing Westgate is more ornate, and there is an octagonal tower with a spire on the corner. The right section has three bays, it is gabled, and contains three segmental-headed windows in the first floor, and a large window with an ogee head above, and a between them is a large ornately decorated and inscribed plaque. The section to the left includes two recessed entries with pierced balconies.	II
57 and 59 Westgate; 53.68213°N 1.50112°W		1877–78	A bank designed by Lockwood and Mawson, with three storeys, and seven bays. The ground floor is rusticated with some vermiculation, and contains a central doorway with a segmental pediment In the left bay is a passage entry, in the right bay is a doorway, the other bays contain windows, and all have carved keystones and vermiculated voussoirs. The middle three bays project, in the upper floors with engaged Corinthian columns. There are rusticated quoins, and an entablature with a modillion and dentilled cornice. The parapet has panels with rosettes, and a round central pediment with a clock face and carved foliage.	II
Town Hall; 53.68390°N 1.50145°W		1877–80	The town hall was designed by T. E. Collcutt, it is in stone, and has Welsh slate roofs with ornamental shaped and pedimented gables. The main east front has three storeys and attics, and five bays. In the top floor are large pedimented bay windows, the attic has a balustraded balcony, and in the first floor are oriel windows. In the centre is the entrance with a decorative surround and a balustraded balcony above. At the north corner is a six-stage tower with clock faces, a parapet, and a tall truncated pyramidal roof. The north front has three storeys and seven bays.	I
Magistrates Court; 53.68404°N 1.50218°W		1878–79	Originally a fire and police station, the court building is in stone with a floor band, and an entablature with a bracketed cornice and a blocking course. There are two storeys, and the mai|n front has seven bays. The round-arched doorway is flanked by columns, there is carving in the spandrels, and the keystone is carved with a policeman's head. The windows are sashes with cornices on consoles, those in the ground floor have moulded lintels and friezes with handcuffs.	II
Former Bank and Bank Manager's House; 53.68301°N 1.49939°W		1881	The bank and manager's house, on a corner site, has later been used for other purposes. It is in red brick with stone dressings, a split-level mansard roof in Westmorland slate on the original bank, and a flat roof on the house. There are two storeys, attics and a basement, the bank has six bays, and the lower house has five. There is a plinth, string courses, and a balustraded parapet with finials. The doorway on the bank has tapered pilasters with Ionic capitals on scroll bases, carrying a decorated and moulded entablature with consoles and a pediment, and a fanlight with a moulded surround and a keystone. The windows are casements, those in the ground floor with friezes and pediments. On the Wood Street front are three pedimented dormers, and on the Silver Street front is a decorated chimney stack with a plaque, above which is a pedimented entablature.	II
Cattle Trough and Drinking Fountain; 53.67336°N 1.50298°W		1888	Immediately south-east of the entrance to Clarence Park is a trough in red granite At its north end is a square column with a ball finial, a basin and a tap. On the column are an inscription and a verse from a poem.	II
Drinking fountain 53.67353°N 1.50364°W		1893	The drinking fountain in Clarence Park is in sandstone with some grey granite panels. It has an octagonal plan, and stands on four octagonal steps. There are four round columns, each carrying a basin under a pedimented alcove. Above is a decorative feature with gablets and a pyramidal roof.	II
Theatre Royal; 53.68212°N 1.50257°W		1894	An opera house designed by Frank Matcham, with an extension added to the left in 1905. It is in thinly rendered brick, with the gable facing the road. The original block has three storeys and five bays, and the extension has two storeys and a dome on the corner. In the ground floor is a modern entrance. Above are round-arched windows with decorative keystones, between which are carved busts of composers in scrolled roundels under serpentine open pediments. Over these are pilasters surmounted by ball finials, and a lettered plaque. Inside the theatre is elaborate decoration.	II*
County Hall; 53.68455°N 1.50267°W		1894–98	The County Hall was designed by Gibson and Russell, and was later enlarged. It is built in Grindleford stone with tiled roofs, and has a lozenge-shaped plan around a central court that is bisected by a central range. At the southeast corner is a five-storey polygonal tower with a dome and a cupola, at the base of which is a round-arched entrance with a balcony above, and on the north corner is an octagonal turret with a spirelet. Other features include decorative gables, heraldic and symbolic carvings, and a six-bay first-floor arcaded loggia. The interior is elaborately decorated.	I
Monument to Battle of Wakefield; 53.66342°N 1.48879°W		1897	The monument in the grounds of Manygate School commemorates Richard, Duke of York, who died in the Battle of Wakefield in 1460. It consists of a column in Gothic style by Gerald Horsley. The column is octagonal, on a plinth with an inscription. At the top is gabled arcading containing figures and symbols, surmounted by a short spire.	I
The former White Horse Hotel; 53.68210°N 1.50135°W		c. 1901	The building is in stone with a Welsh slate roof, and the gable end faces the street. There are three storeys and an attic, and five narrow bays. In the ground floor is a central doorway and windows, the doorway and outer windows round-arched with pediments on long consoles. The windows in the upper floors are flanked by triple pilasters, and above them are carved panels. The attic contains an arcaded of three windows, above which is a garland, and coat of arms in the gable.	II
Statue of Queen Victoria; 53.68495°N 1.50158°W		1904	The statue of Queen Victoria is by Francis John Williamson, and was moved to its present site in 1985. It consists of a bronze statue of the queen in court robes standing and holding a sceptre on a plinth of two steps. Below this is a stepped plinth of polished pink granite with inscriptions.	II
The Elephant and Castle Public House; 53.68155°N 1.50370°W		c. 1905	The public house is in red brick, with buff terracotta, and brown and green tiles, and it has a slate roof. There are two storeys and three bays, each bay gabled, the central gable round-arched, and the outer ones with segmental pediments, containing the name of the pub in gold lettering. In the ground floor the outer bays contain windows with wide four-centred arched heads, in the middle bay are two round-headed doorways, and all are divided by decorated pilasters. Above is a decorated frieze, the middle floor contains windows with triangular or open segmental pediments, and above them are lettered panels.	II
The Art House (Former Library); 53.68254°N 1.50377°W		1905–06	The former library is in stone on a plinth, with moulded eaves, and slate roofs. It is in Neo-Baroque style and has a single storey. In the centre is a bay with quoins that contains a doorway with Ionic half-columns, an entablature, and a decorated hood. Above this is a semicircular fanlight with a rusticated surround, a shield, and a gable containing a mullioned window. On the roof is a tower that has a cupola with an ogee cap and an ornate iron weathervane. The central bay is flanked by wings that contain tall round-headed windows with round hoods breaking through the eaves, and circular windows with moulded surrounds and keystones.	II
Former Midland Bank; 53.68250°N 1.50102°W		Early 20th century	The bank is in stone with a green slate roof. There are two storeys and five bays. Flanking the bays are fluted Corinthian columns on plinths, carrying an entablature with a modillion cornice, and a tall parapet with alternate sections of panels and balustrading. In the outer bays of the ground floor are doorways, each with an architrave, an entablature, and a pediment. Between them are round-arched sash windows with architraves and triple keystones. In the upper floor are smaller windows with architraves.	II
War memorial, Queen Elizabeth Grammar School; 53.68819°N 1.50136°W		1921	The war memorial in the grounds of the school consists of the bronze statue of a bugler standing on a square stone column with a stepped plinth and a low base. At the corners are fluted Doric pilasters carrying an entablature and a frieze. On the front is a bronze sword of remembrance, the school coat of arms and a wreath. On the base is an inscription and on the sides are bronze plaques with the names of those lost in the First World War.	II
Telephone kiosk outside Crown Court; 53.68426°N 1.50151°W		1935	A K6 type telephone kiosk, designed by Giles Gilbert Scott. Constructed in cast iron with a square plan and a dome, it has three unperforated crowns in the top panels.	II
Telephone kiosk east of the Employment Exchange; 53.68074°N 1.50750°W		1935	A K6 type telephone kiosk, designed by Giles Gilbert Scott. Constructed in cast iron with a square plan and a dome, it has three unperforated crowns in the top panels.	II
