= Wakefield Mechanics' Institute =

Museum in Wakefield, England

Coordinates: 53°41′02″N 1°30′03″W

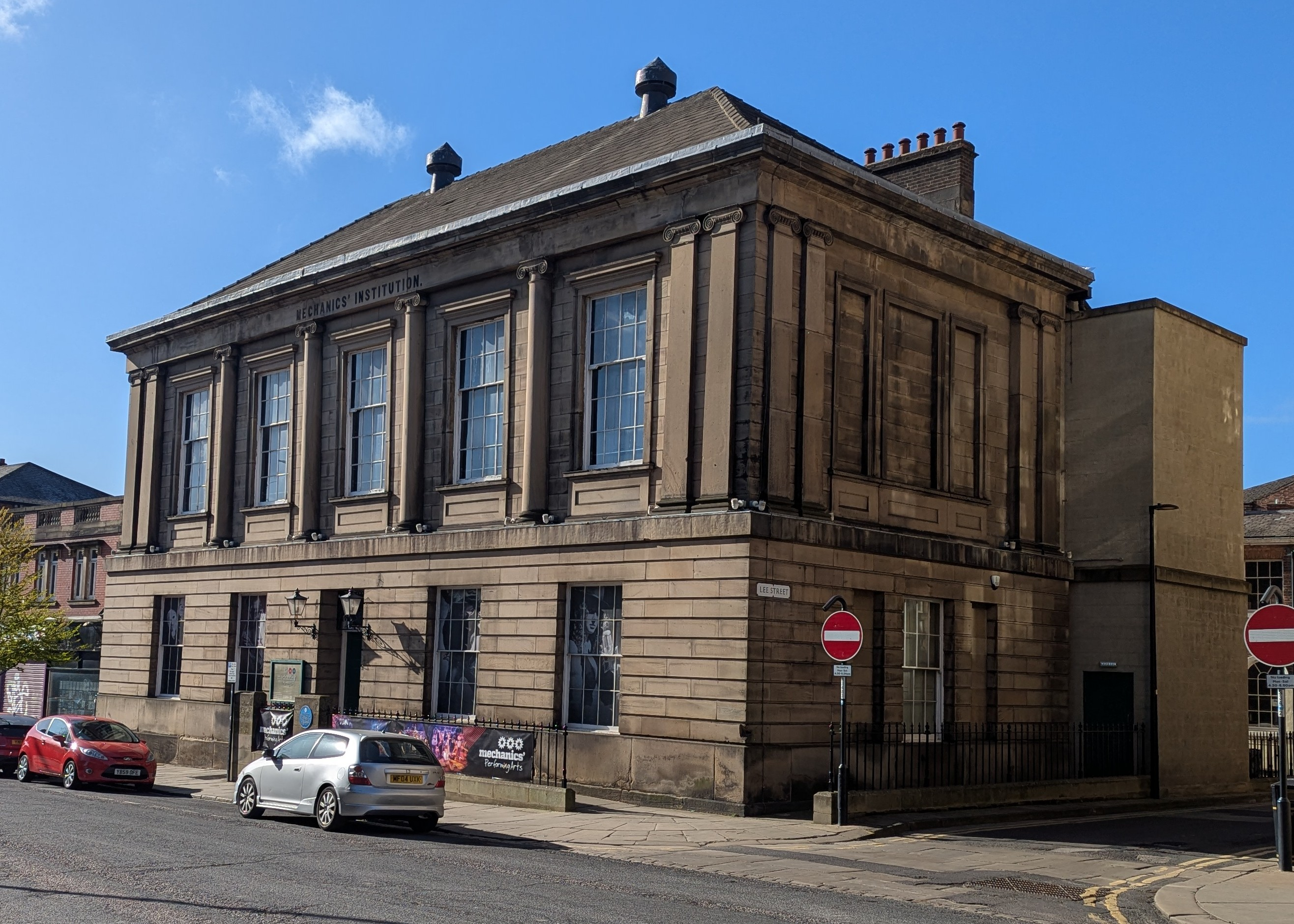
The building in 2025

Wakefield Mechanics' Institute is a historic building in the city centre of Wakefield, in West Yorkshire, in England.

The building was constructed between 1820 and 1821, to serve as public rooms, with a music saloon on the first floor. The saloon opened in 1823, and the building soon also housed a subscription library, a newsroom, a savings bank, and a public dispensary, which was in the basement. The dispensary closed in 1832 following the death of the apothecary, who was living in the damp basement. Public baths were instead installed in the basement. From 1828, the saloon housed the town's annual charity ball, its most prominent social event.

In 1838, a corn exchange was opened on Westgate, and events were instead held in its assembly room. In 1842, the saloon became a mechanics' institute. In 1897, the National Federation of SubPostmasters was founded at a meeting at the institute. In 1910, the building was renamed as the Institute of Literature and Science, but it declined in popularity, and closed in 1935. It was taken over by Wakefield Council, which let rooms out to various organisations, while allowing the saloon to be used for events.

In 1955, the building became Wakefield Museum, which remained there until 2012. It was Grade II* listed in 1971.

The building is two storeys high and five bays wide. It is built of sandstone, with rustication on the ground floor; the roof is covered in Welsh slate. The upper floors feature Ionic order pilasters, sash windows, and above them a frieze in which is inscribed "MECHANICS' INSTITUTION". The rear elevation is stuccoed and includes windows to the basement. There are wrought iron railings, with some finials in the form of urns.

== See also ==
- Grade II* listed buildings in Wakefield
- Listed buildings in Wakefield
