= Kettlethorpe Hall, West Yorkshire =

Listed house in Wakefield, West Yorkshire, England

Coordinates: 53°38′45″N 01°29′52″W

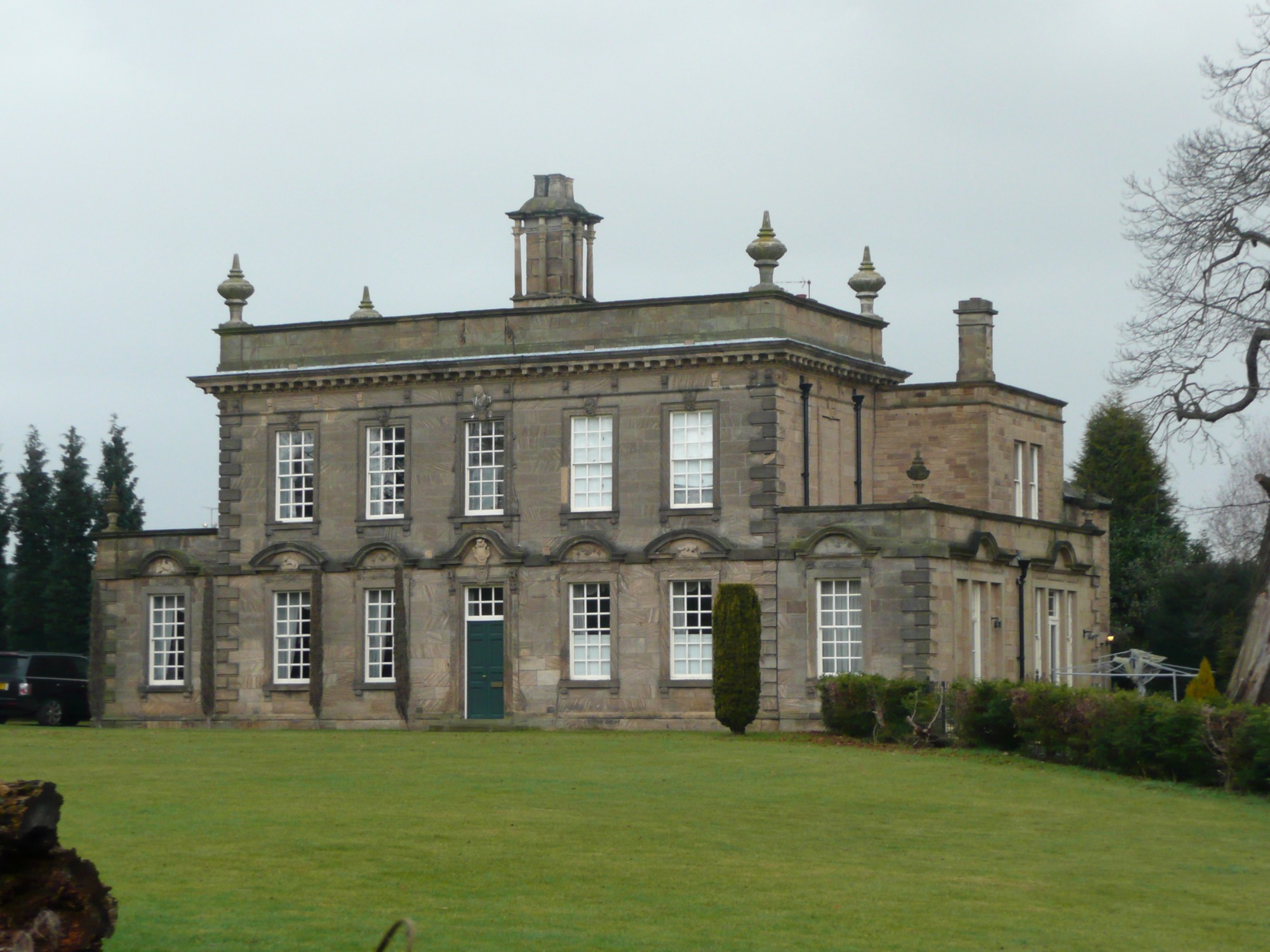
Kettlethorpe Hall

Kettlethorpe Hall is a Georgian house in Wakefield, West Yorkshire, England. The hall is a Grade I listed building. From 1847 until 1996, the grounds of the hall contained the façade of a 14th-century chapel on the front of a boathouse, which was a Grade II* listed building.

== History ==
Kettlethorpe Hall is a Georgian house on the outskirts of Wakefield, built by the Pilkington family It is a two-storey building constructed of stone, and contains Doric columns. The house underwent multiple renovations in the 19th century. The first floor keystone showed the date of construction as 1727.

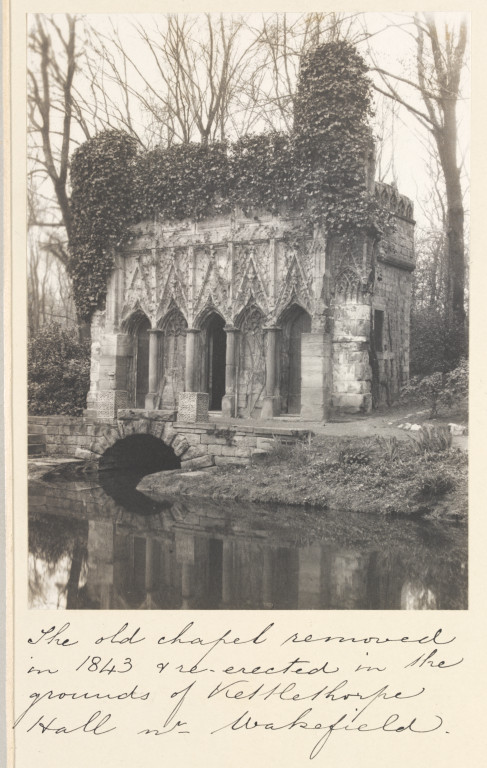
Original façade of the Chantry Chapel on Wakefield Bridge on a boathouse in the grounds of Kettlethorpe Hall.

In 1847, the façade of the 14th century Chantry Chapel (also known as the Sentry Chapel) on Wakefield Bridge was moved to Kettlethorpe Hall, and the original restored. The façade was attached to a boathouse folly, beside the hall's artificial lake. In 1859, the folly was temporarily used as a mortuary. In the West Riding of Yorkshire volume of Pevsner Architectural Guides, Nikolaus Pevsner described the boathouse as "the most precious of all boat houses".

In 1950, Kettlethorpe Hall was purchased by Wakefield Council, and was used as a retirement home until 1983. In 1988, the hall was bought by Yorkshire Preservation Trust, who converted it into two separate houses. Wakefield Council still owned the grounds surrounding the hall. In 1996, the remains of the boathouse were removed from the grounds of Kettlethorpe Hall by Wakefield Council, who put it into storage. The remaining stones of the boathouse became a scheduled monument, and in 2014, they were put into the secret garden at Thornes Park in Wakefield. The stones were erected at an angle to make them easier to view.

Nowadays, the house is privately owned, but the grounds are a public park. In 1953, Kettlethorpe Hall became a Grade I listed building. The boathouse is separately listed as a Grade II* listed building.

== See also ==
- Grade I listed buildings in West Yorkshire
- Listed buildings in Wakefield
