= National Federation of SubPostmasters =

Former trade union of the United Kingdom

- Abbreviation: NFSP
- Formation: 1897
- Purpose: Trade association
- Headquarters: Shoreham-by-Sea, West Sussex
- Region served: United Kingdom
- Chief executive officer: Calum Brian Greenhow
- Website: www.nfsp.org.uk

The National Federation of SubPostmasters (NFSP) is a trade association for subpostmasters in the United Kingdom primarily funded by the Post Office Ltd.

Subpostmasters are self-employed business operators, approved by Post Office Ltd to act as their agents in running Post Office branches (outlets). Post Office Ltd is contractually obliged to consult the NFSP on behalf of subpostmasters.

The NFSP has almost fifty branches throughout the UK, separated into ten geographical regions. Each member is represented by their local Branch Secretary and Regional Secretary, if anyone is in the role; the Board of Non-Executive Directors is made up of serving subpostmasters (each representing a UK region) and two representatives from organisations with a portfolio of post offices (Ryman and SPAR).

== History ==
On 19 April 1897 a group of up to 90 subpostmasters assembled at the Music Saloon, Wood Street, Wakefield to consider forming a national association to "improve the conditions under which subpostmasters labour and to undertake the advancement of our interests by all legitimate and honourable means".

The federation was formed, with Wakefield as its headquarters, and the first conference was held in Nottingham on 11 April 1898. The first edition of a monthly newspaper The SubPostmaster was published on 4 September 1899, and Joseph Ranns, founder and first National President, wrote the inaugural article. The magazine is still published today. In February 1947, the federation's headquarters moved to Shoreham-by-Sea, Sussex.

The NFSP was originally a trade union. In 2013 the Post Office stated that they did not recognise the NFSP for collective bargaining purposes.

Following a ruling of the Employment Appeal Tribunal that subpostmasters were not employees of Post Office Ltd, but were engaged under a contract for services, the Trades Union Certification Officer wrote to the NFSP to say that he believed the organisation did not meet the legal requirements to continue to be recognised as a trade union. Having rejected arguments against this by the NFSP, the Certification Officer stripped the organisation of trade union status on 13 January 2014. Via a democratic vote, members chose overwhelmingly to reject amalgamation with other trade unions. The NFSP changed its status to a trade association on 1 October 2016.

Since 2016 membership of the NFSP has not charged a membership fee to subpostmasters. The NFSP instead receives funding from Post Office Ltd, consisting of an annual grant payment and funding for approved projects that are made under a Grant Framework Agreement introduced in 2015. The NFSP says its funding allows it to provide practical support to members but does not prevent it from challenging or criticising the Post Office.

== Horizon scandal ==
The NFSP was criticised in March 2019 by judge Peter Fraser for its actions in relation to the Horizon IT scandal. The judgment handed down by him stated that "the NFSP is not remotely independent of the Post Office, nor does it appear to put its members' interests above its own separate commercial interests." The NFSP claimed it had been misled by the Post Office.

The NFSP later issued the following statement:

The NFSP should have done more under its previous leadership to challenge PO privately and in public and to prevent people from falling victim to this extended miscarriage of justice. We can't change the decisions of the past, but the NFSP is committed to ensuring that nothing like the Horizon scandal ever happens again.

In March 2020, the parliamentary Business, Energy and Industrial Strategy Committee launched a "Post Office & Horizon inquiry" and included within the inquiry's terms of reference the question "What role did the National Federation of Sub-postmasters play in the Horizon scandal in terms of representing affected sub-postmasters?" Converted into a statutory inquiry in 2021, the Post Office Horizon IT Inquiry, led by retired High Court judge Sir Wyn Williams, included within its list of issues an examination of the knowledge of the NFSP (along with the Communication Workers Union, UK Government Investments and the government) about problems relating to Horizon.
