= Elizabethan Gallery =

Building in Wakefield, Yorkshire, England

Coordinates: 53°41′05″N 1°29′49″W

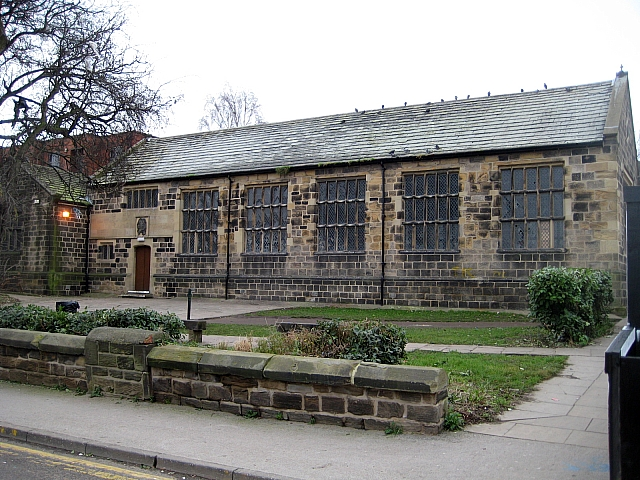
The building, in 2008

The Elizabethan Gallery is a Grade II* listed historic building in the city centre of Wakefield, in West Yorkshire, England.

The building was constructed in 1598, as the Queen Elizabeth Grammar School, funded by the Savile family. It was soon extended to the north, and in 1895 was also extended to the south. The school moved in 1855 to a site on Northgate, and the building became the Wakefield Cathedral School. Wakefield Council purchased the building in 1979, and in 1981, the building began being used as an exhibition space for the city art gallery. More recently, it has been hired out as an event space.

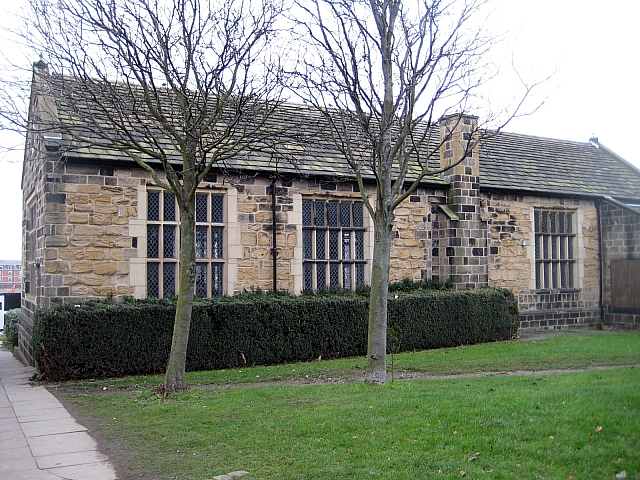
Rear of the building, in 2008

The original part of the school is one storey high and six bays long. It is built of sandstone and has windows with mullions and transoms, and a stone slate roof with an original frame. In the south bay are carved the names of members of the Savile family, along with its coat of arms and an owl crest. The north extension is in a similar style, while the south wing features a Tudor arch doorway.

The building is now next to the Trinity Walk shopping centre, but is distinguished from it by its lawns and stone paving.

== See also ==
- Listed buildings in Wakefield
