= Thornes Park =

Park in Wakefield, West Yorkshire, England

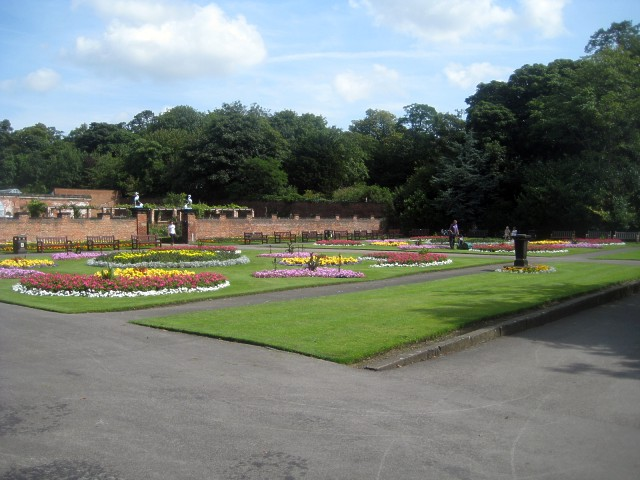
- Formal garden at Thornes Park
- Interactive map of Thornes Park
- Location: Wakefield, West Yorkshire
- Coordinates: 53°40′21″N 01°30′36″W
- Area: 60 hectares (150 acres)
- Operator: Wakefield Council

Thornes Park is a large public park situated close to the centre of Wakefield, West Yorkshire, England. Along with Clarence Park and Holmfield Park it forms a large parkland to the south west of the city.

The park hosts a model railway, formal gardens, a lake, an indoor leisure centre and an athletics track. The park also has 60 hectares of open spaces and a two-mile circular walkway around the park.

A mound lies in the centre of the park, once part of an old motte-and-bailey castle, which offers views across the city.

== See also ==
- Listed buildings in Wakefield
