= Westgate Unitarian Chapel =

Historic chapel in Wakefield, England

Coordinates: 53°40′56″N 1°30′16″W

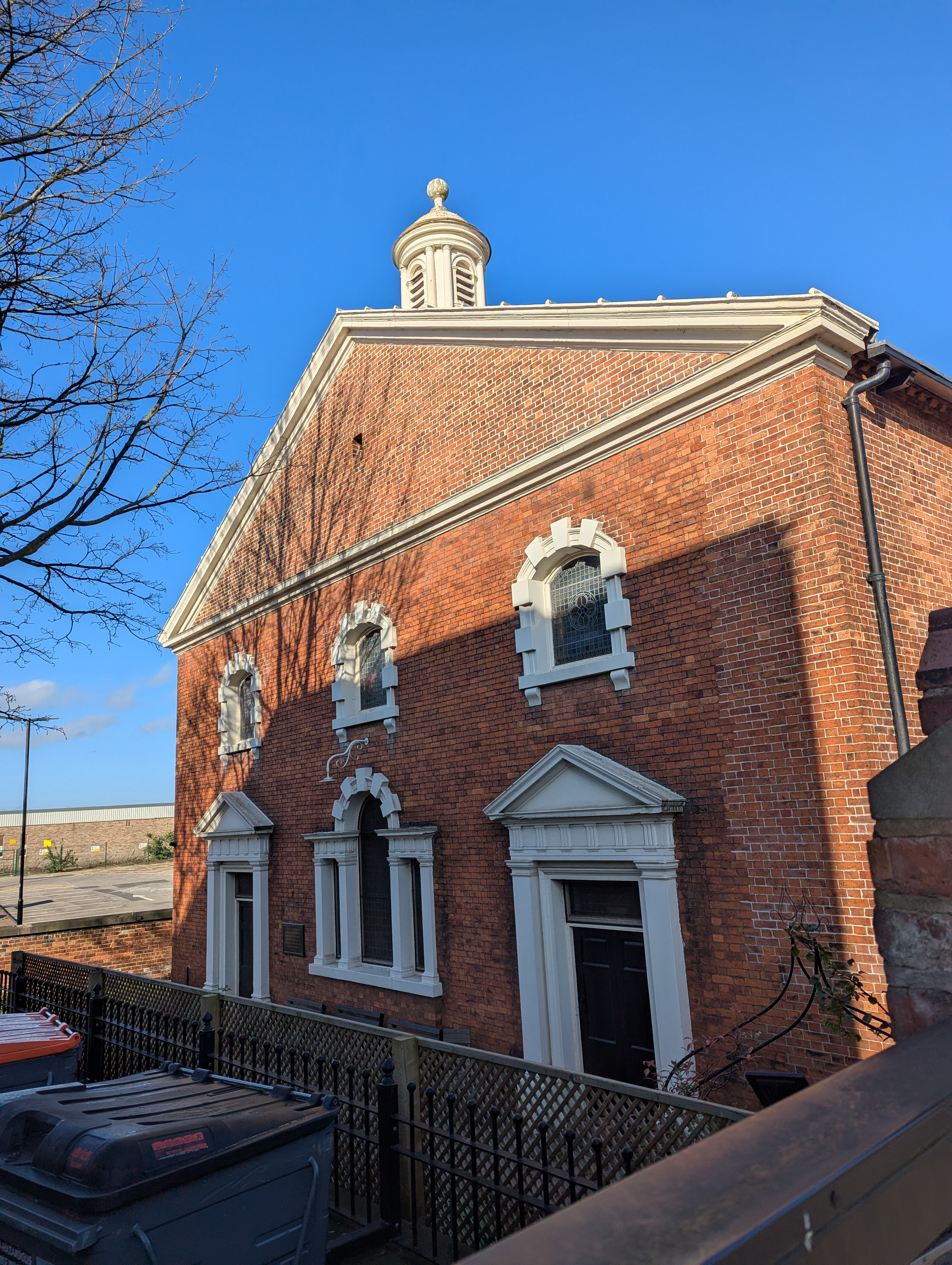
Front of the building, in 2025

Westgate Unitarian Chapel is a historic chapel in the city centre of Wakefield, in West Yorkshire, England.

The origins of the chapel lie in a group of supporters of Joshua Kirkby, who was ejected from Wakefield Parish Church, and a group of non-conformists in Alverthorpe. The two decided to build a joint Presbyterian chapel, just north of Westgate, halfway between their two settlements, which opened in 1697.

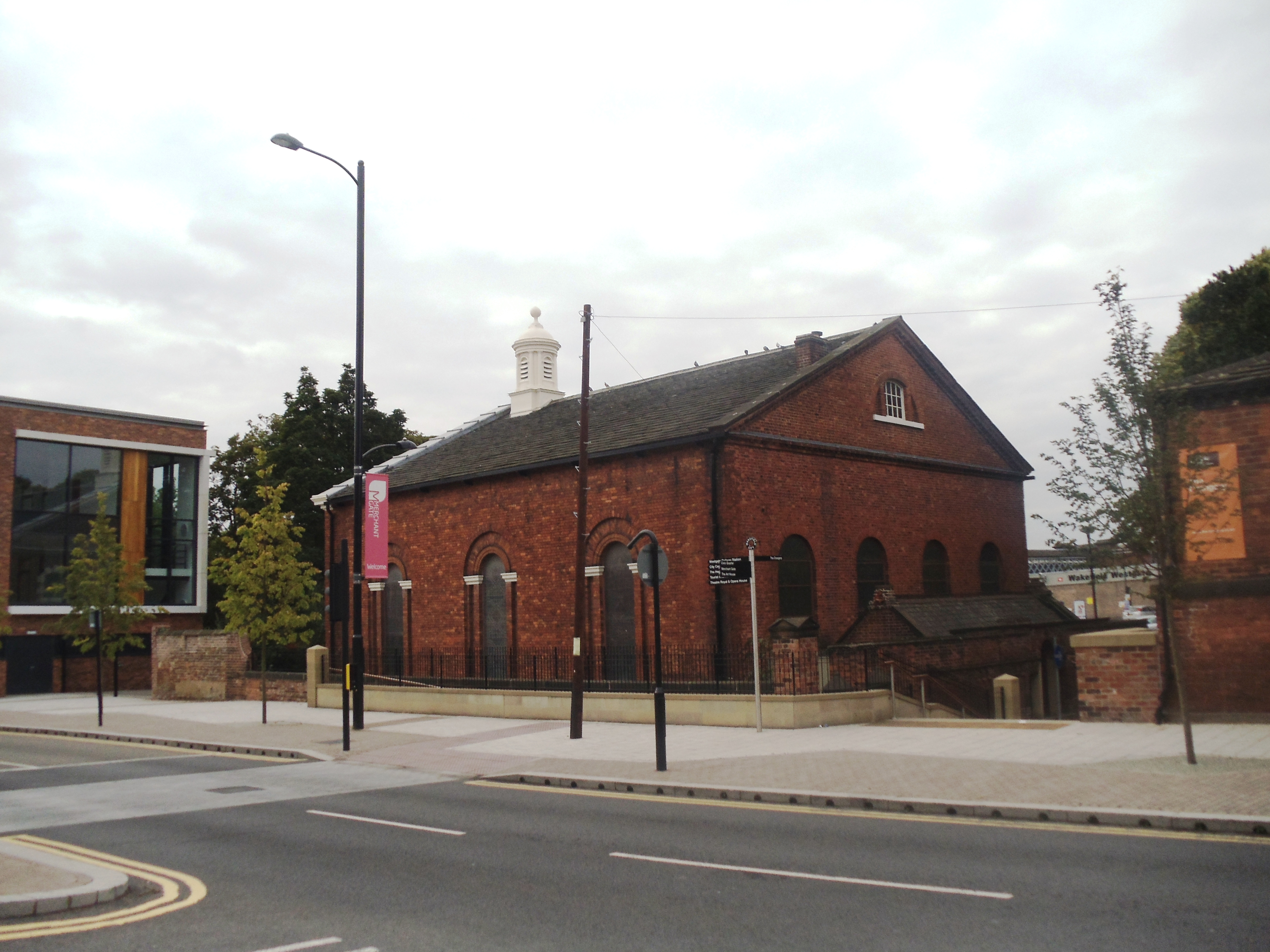
Rear of the building, in 2011

In 1752 the chapel was replaced by the current building. Later in the century, the congregation joined the Unitarian movement. It is built of brick, and is two storeys high and three bays long. It is in the Doric order, with a cupola. There are several Venetian windows on the ground floor. Inside the chapel is plain, with a pulpit of 1737 moved from the former chapel, and an organ constructed in 1847. Most of the woodwork dates from the late 19th century. There are catacombs under the chapel, which are occasionally opened to the public.

The chapel was Grade II* listed in 1971.

== Related articles ==
- Grade II* listed buildings in Wakefield
- Listed buildings in Wakefield
