= Northgate (Wakefield) =

Street in Wakefield, England

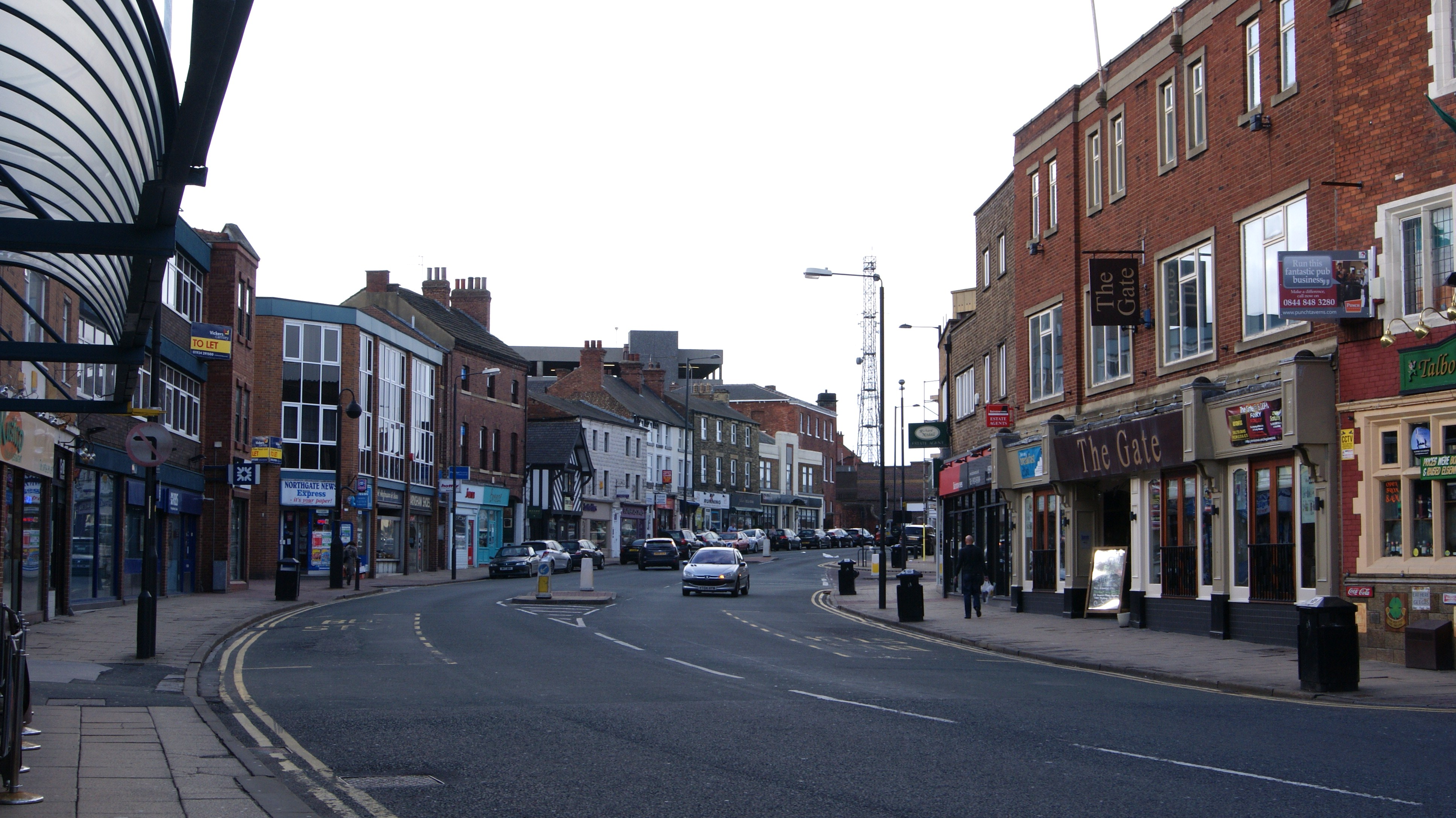
View north west on the street, in 2013

Northgate is a street in the city centre of Wakefield, in West Yorkshire, in England.

== History ==
The street dates from the Mediaeval period, when it was one of three major roads in the town, heading towards Leeds. It was at the centre of one of the town's three quarters. A gatehouse was constructed across the street, near the location of the Chantry of St John the Baptist, later the location of the grammar school. The part of the street near the town became built up with burgage plots, although there were fewer than on Westgate and Kirkgate. Numerous buildings on the street were demolished in the 1960s. The Transforming Cities Fund describes the road as "a key route between the city centre, St Johns and the M1".

== Layout and architecture ==
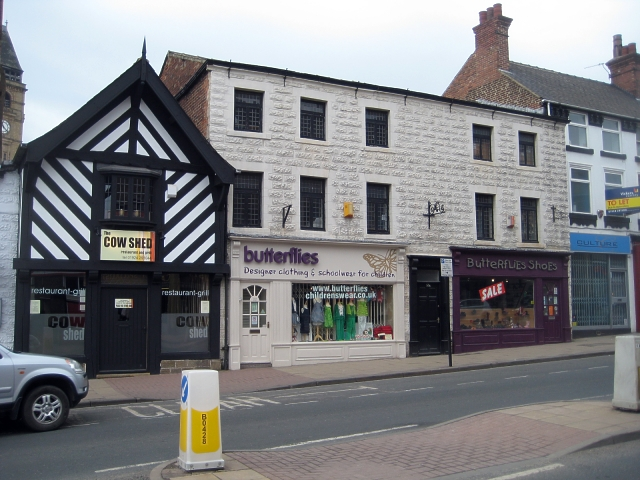
Timber-framed buildings on the street

The street starts at a junction with Westgate and Kirkgate. It runs north, past the west end of Wakefield Cathedral, and junctions with Bread Street and Cross Square. It then opens out into the Bull Ring square, off which Marygate, Westmorland Street, Union Street and Radcliffe Place run. It then turns north-west, past junctions with Talbot and Falcon Yard, Cross Street, Providence Street, Gill's Yard, Rishworth Street, and Upper York Street. At a roundabout, it meets Marsh Way, and becomes the A61 road. It has junctions with Cardigan Terrace, Arundel Street, Wentworth Terrace, Howard Street, Albion Street, and North Road Terrace, before terminating at a crossroads with St John's North and Westfield Road. Beyond this, its continuation is Leeds Road.

Listed buildings on the street include 2–10 Northgate, dating from around 1800; the late-15th century timber-framed 53 and 55 Northgate; the 16th-century 57 Northgate, part of which was formerly the warehouse of Wright and Elwick furniture makers; the large houses at 71 an 95 Northgate, dating from about 1800; the early-19th century terrace of 87–93 Northgate and similarly dated 97 and 99 Northgate; the buildings of the Queen Elizabeth Grammar School; and an early-19th century house at 158 Northgate. Another notable building is the Talbot & Falcon pub, which has lain on the street since 1700.
