= Theatre Royal, Wakefield =

Theatre in Wakefield, England

Theatre Royal Wakefield
- Theatre Royal and Opera House
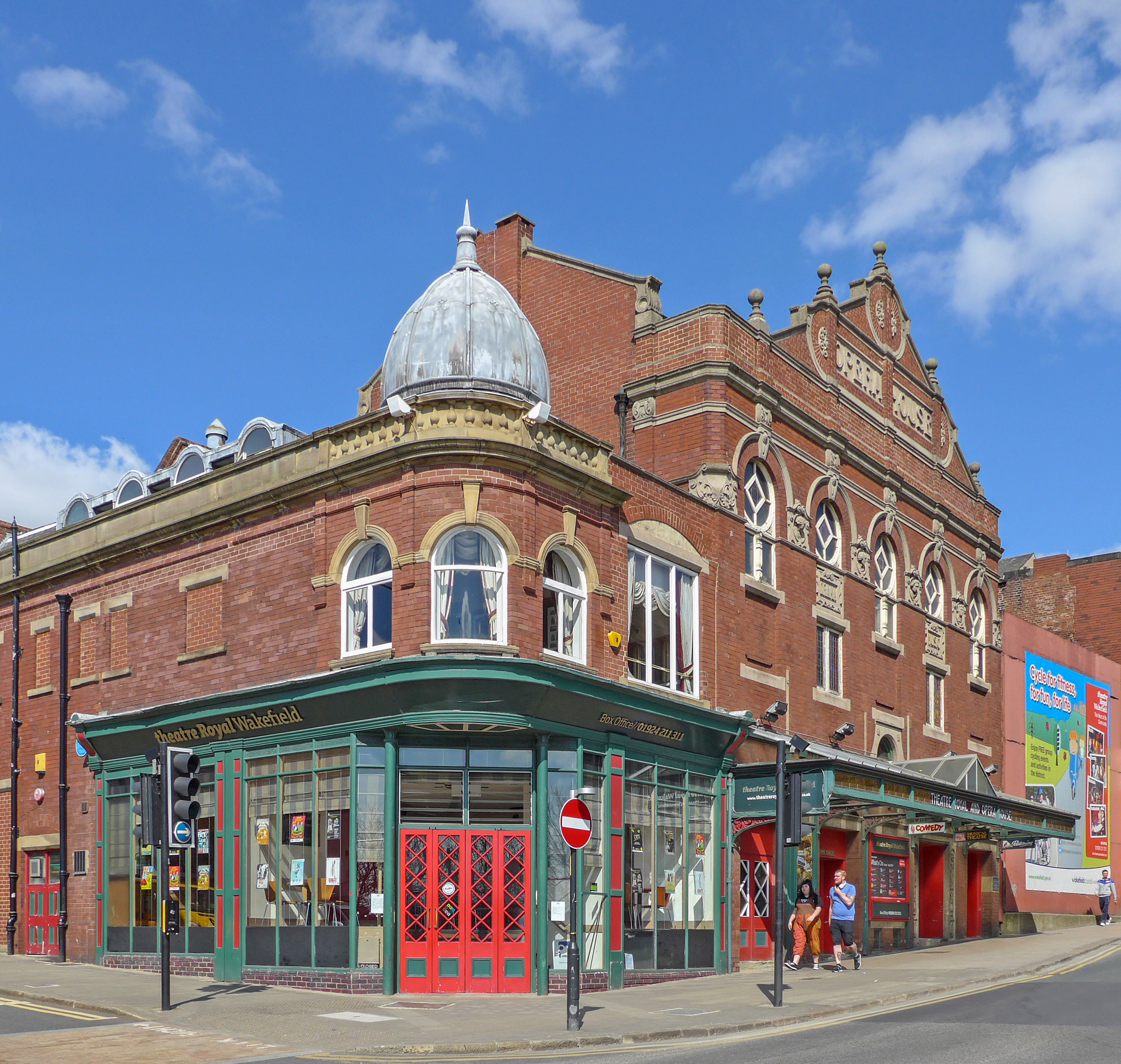
- Theatre Royal, Drury Lane, Wakefield

- Location within West Yorkshire
- Address: Drury Lane, Wakefield, WF1 2TE; West Yorkshire; England
- Coordinates: 53.682087°N 1.502700°W
- Owner: Wakefield Theatre Trust
- Capacity: 499 seats

Construction
- Opened: 1894
- Years active: 1894–1954, 1981 to present
- Architect: Frank Matcham

Listed Building – Grade II*
- Official name: Theatre Royal
- Designated: 1 February 1979
- Reference no.: 1258906

Website
- www.theatreroyalwakefield.co.uk

The Theatre Royal Wakefield is a theatre in Wakefield, England, which dates back to 1894. The theatre was originally known as the Theatre Royal and Opera House and dates back to the 1770s.

The theatre lies on the corner Westgate and Drury Lane. It was designed in 1894 as the Wakefield Opera House, by theatre architect Frank Matcham, and was built for a price of £13,000. The Theatre Royal Wakefield is the smallest remaining of Matcham's theatres. It is a Grade II* listed building.

In the 1920s the theatre had to compete against cinemas and in the summer live shows were replaced by films. In 1954 the theatre closed and became a picture house, and a few years later, a bingo hall. However, in 1981 it reopened as the Wakefield Theatre Royal under chairman Sir Rodney Walker. Support was given to revitalise the theatre from city leaders and music and drama amateurs and professionals.

Theatre Royal Wakefield operates as both a producing and a receiving house. In 2011 British playwright John Godber joined the Theatre as Creative Director, and the Theatre now plays a producing role for The John Godber Company.

Theatre Royal Wakefield works with young people, with its Performance Academy operating across two sites in Wakefield and Pontefract. It runs dance, music and drama training for children aged from 5 to 18, as well as its youth company, Wakefield Youth Music Theatre.

In 2012 the theatre applied for funding from the Heritage Lottery Fund for a £2.6 million project to restore the theatre building.

In 2019 the theatre became a Theatre of Sanctuary, "a movement using art, theatre and culture to welcome people seeking sanctuary in the UK", after their year long engagement with City of Sanctuary UK.

== See also ==
- Listed buildings in Wakefield
- Theatre Royal (disambiguation)
