= Wakefield Court House =

Court house in Wakefield, West Yorkshire, England

Coordinates: 53.6843°N 1.5018°W

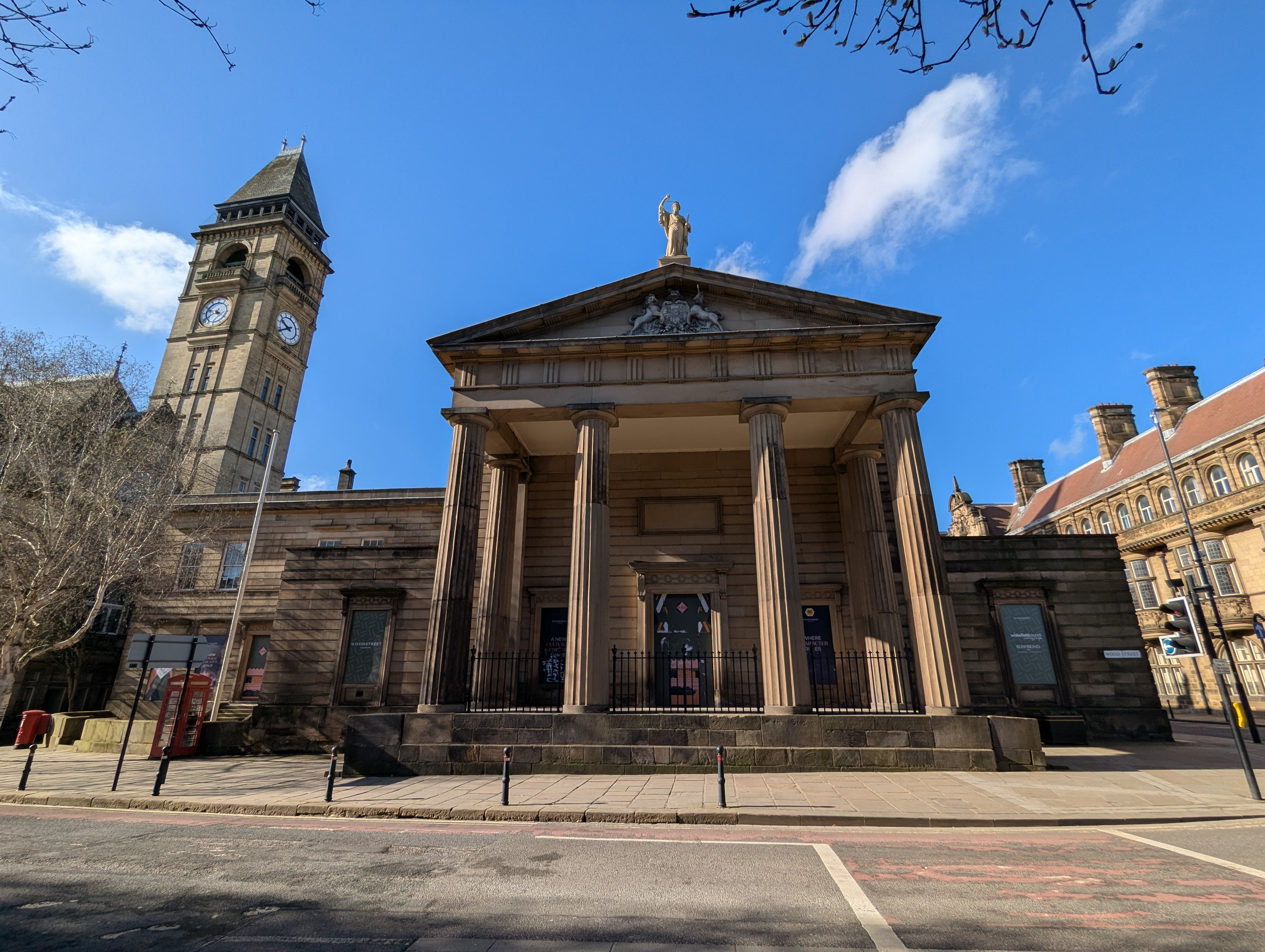
The building, in 2025

Wakefield Court House is a historic building in the city centre of Wakefield, a city in West Yorkshire, in England.

The building was constructed in 1810, to house the court of quarter sessions. It was extended between 1849 and 1850, and in the 1880s. It later served as the Crown Court and as a County Court, but closed in 1992. It was sold for redevelopment, but little work was undertaken, and the building fell into disrepair. It was purchased by Wakefield Council in 2018, with plans to convert it into a performance space, but in 2023 the council decided that the plan was unviable, and instead sold it to a private developer, Rushbond.

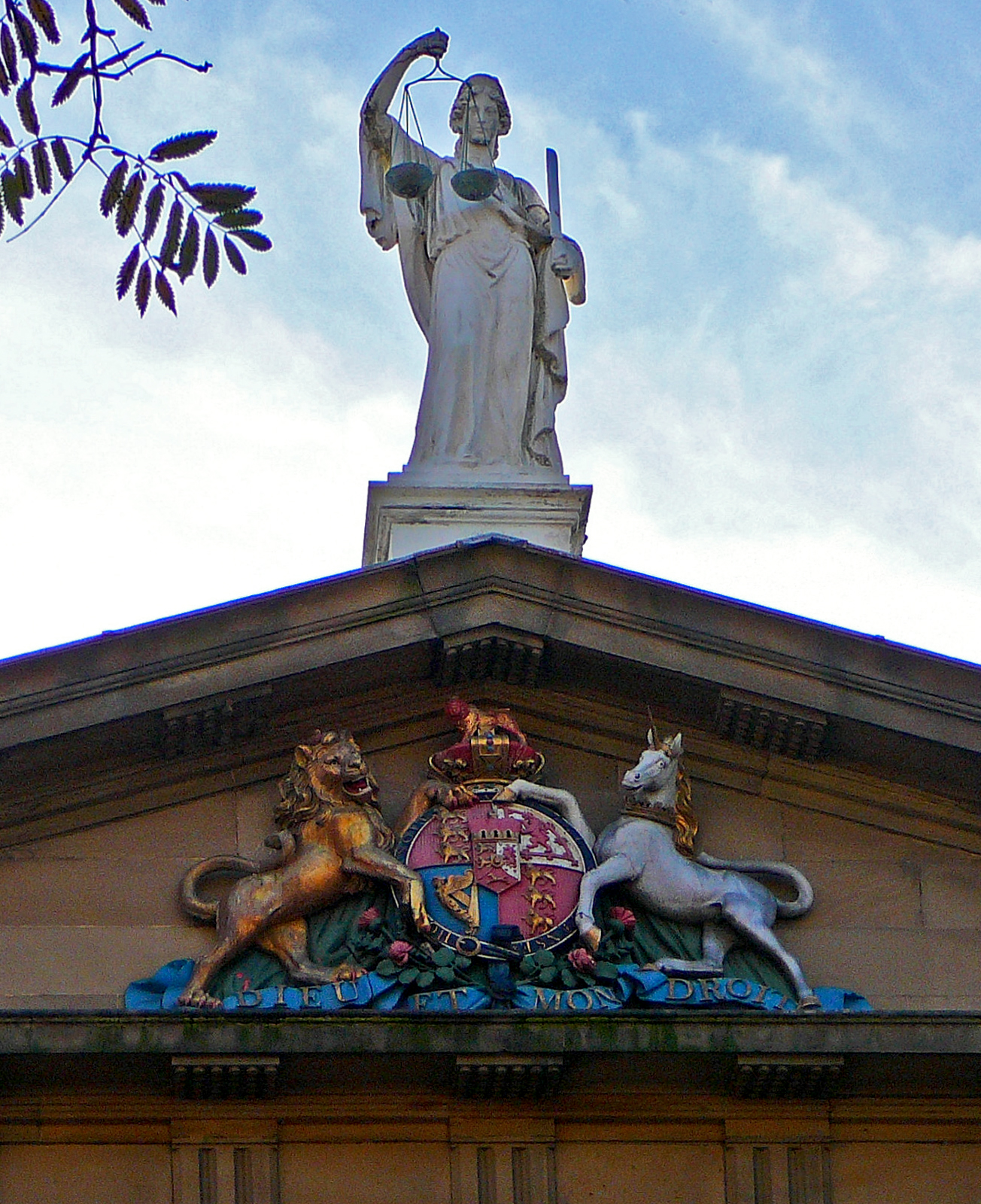
Pediment, with statue of Lady Justice

The building is in the Greek Revival style. It is built of sandstone, and is two storeys high. It has a large Doric order portico. There are single-storey side wings, and there is a two-storey section to the left, set further back.

The building has been Grade II* listed since 1971.
