= Westgate (Wakefield) =

Street in Wakefield, England

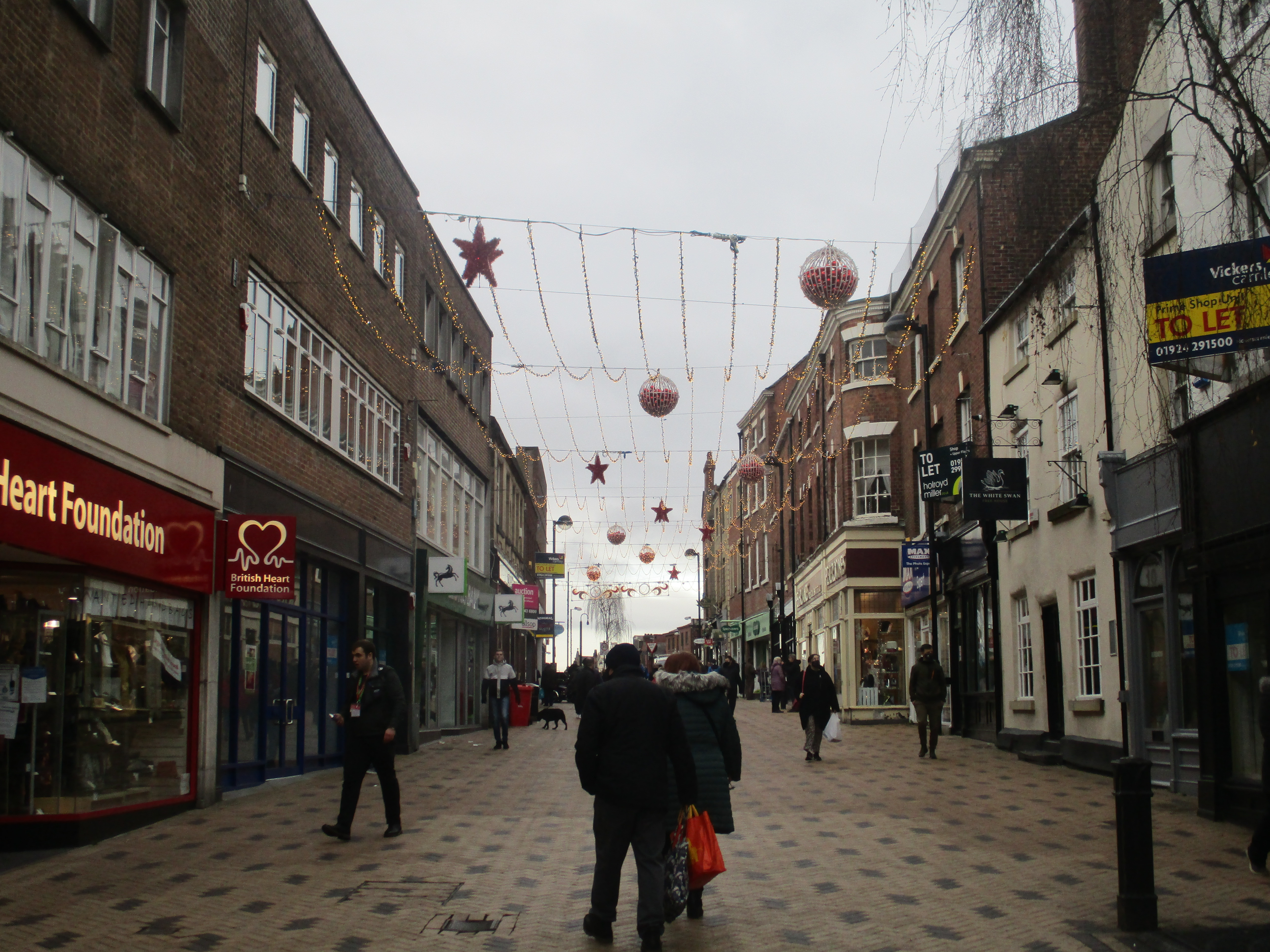
View west on the eastern section of Westgate, in 2020

Westgate is a street in the city centre of Wakefield, a city in West Yorkshire, in England.

== History ==
Westgate was first recorded in 1275, when it was the main route south-west out of Wakefield, along the Calder Valley. The street was at the centre of one of three quarters of the town, and the part of the street nearest the town centre was lined with houses on burgage plots. A gatehouse was constructed across the street, by the location of the present Black Horse pub. The street grew further in importance after the Aire and Calder Navigation was opened in 1709, with goods transported along the road, to reach the canal. The street became lined with the large houses of merchants.

In 1697, a Presbyterian chapel was built just north of Westgate, replaced in 1752 by the Westgate Unitarian Chapel. A theatre was built on the street in 1776, and a corn exchange in 1820, though this was relocated in 1838 and the building finally demolished in 1962. During the 19th century, the street became lined with shops, and an increased number of inns and pubs. In 1856, Wakefield Westgate railway station opened on the south side of the street, moving to the north side in 1867, and further north in the 21st century.

During the early 21st century, the street remained known for bars and nightclubs, but a lack of long-term residents had led some buildings to fall into poor repair. In the 2020s, a Heritage Action Zone was established, to bring buildings back into use, and encourage housing and cultural activity alongside retail.

== Layout and architecture ==
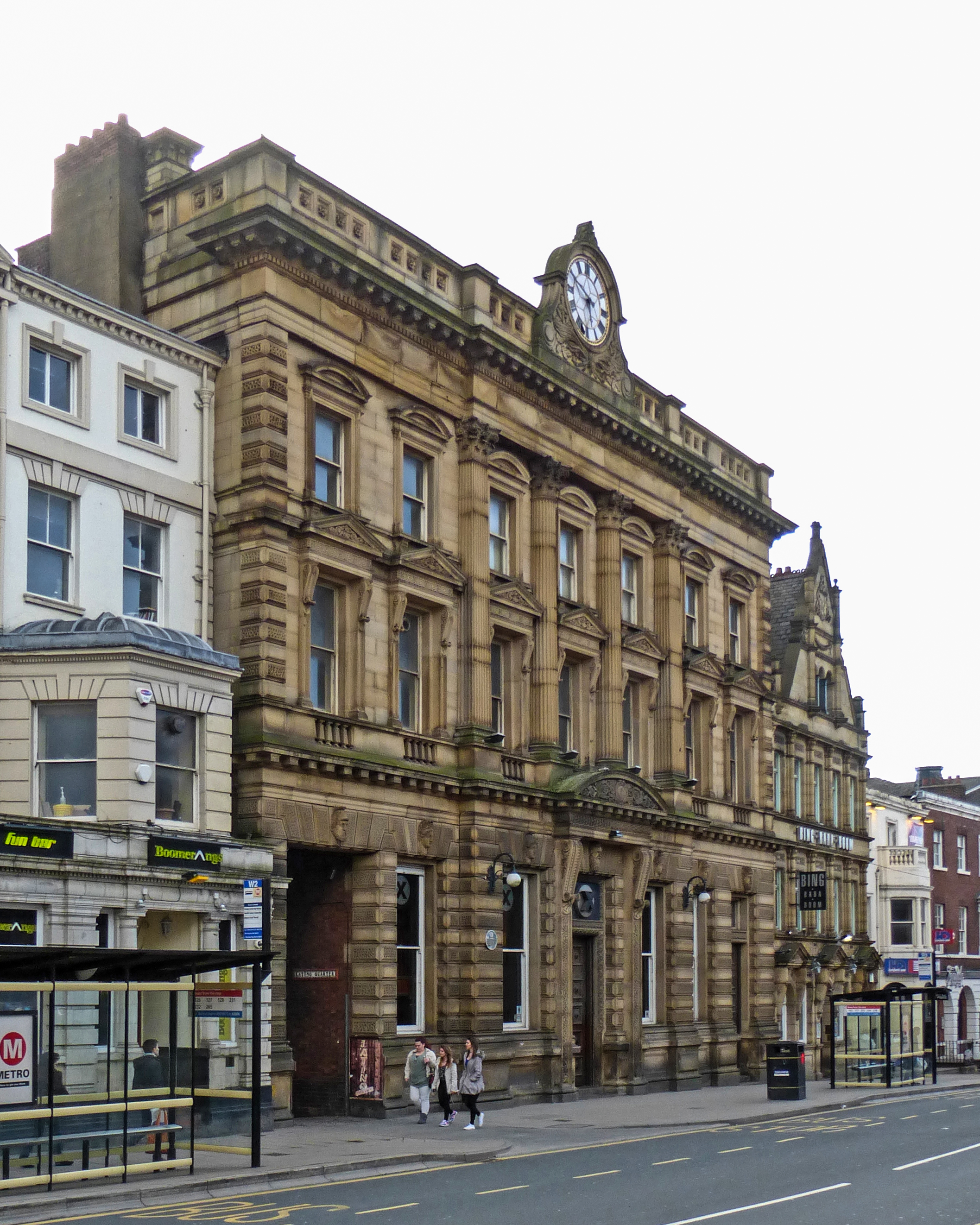
Buildings on the central part of Westgate

The street runs south-west from a junction with Kirkgate and Northgate, to a junction with Ings Road, beyond which its continuation is Westgate End. On its south-east side, it has junctions with Saw Yard, Queen Street, Market Street, Albion Court, White Horse Yard, Bank Street, Smyth Street, and Garden Street; and then beyond the railway bridge, with Piccadilly and Quebec Street. On the north-west side, it has junctions with Marygate, Silver Street, Barstow Square, Woolpack's Yard, Thompson's Yard, Cheapside, Carter Street, Drury Lane, and Mulberry Way; and beyond the railway bridge, with Parliament Street.

There are a large number buildings on the street. On north-west side lie 19th century terraces of shops at 14–22 Westgate and 24–28 Westgate; 18th-century 30 Westgate, 38 Westgate, and 50 and 52 Westgate; the 19th-century NatWest Bank, 60 and 62 Westgate; early-20th century HSBC Bank; early-19th century 70 Westgate, and 72 and 74 Westgate; the grade II* listed Theatre Royal; and 18th-century Pemberton House. South-west of the railway bridge are the 18th-century 136 Westgate; grade II* Austin House; 162 Westgate; 164 Westgate; the 16th-century 166 Westgate; and a telephone kiosk.

On the south-west side of the street are 51–55 Westgate, built in 1772; 57 and 59 Westgate, a former bank built in 1878; the former White Horse Hotel, built in 1901; a Regency house at 65 Westgate; the late-18th century 67 and 69 Westgate; Unity House, built as shops, offices and a meeting hall in 1901; the 18th-century 101 and 103 Westgate; early-19th century 105 Westgate; early-20th century Elephant and Castle pub; and the early-19th century 111 and 113 Westgate. Beyond the bridge are the late-16th century 143 and 145 Westgate; 147 and 149 Westgate, dating from about 1800; late-18th century 153 Westgate; and 18th-century 159 Westgate.
