= Bridge chapel =

Chapel built on or immediately adjacent to a road bridge

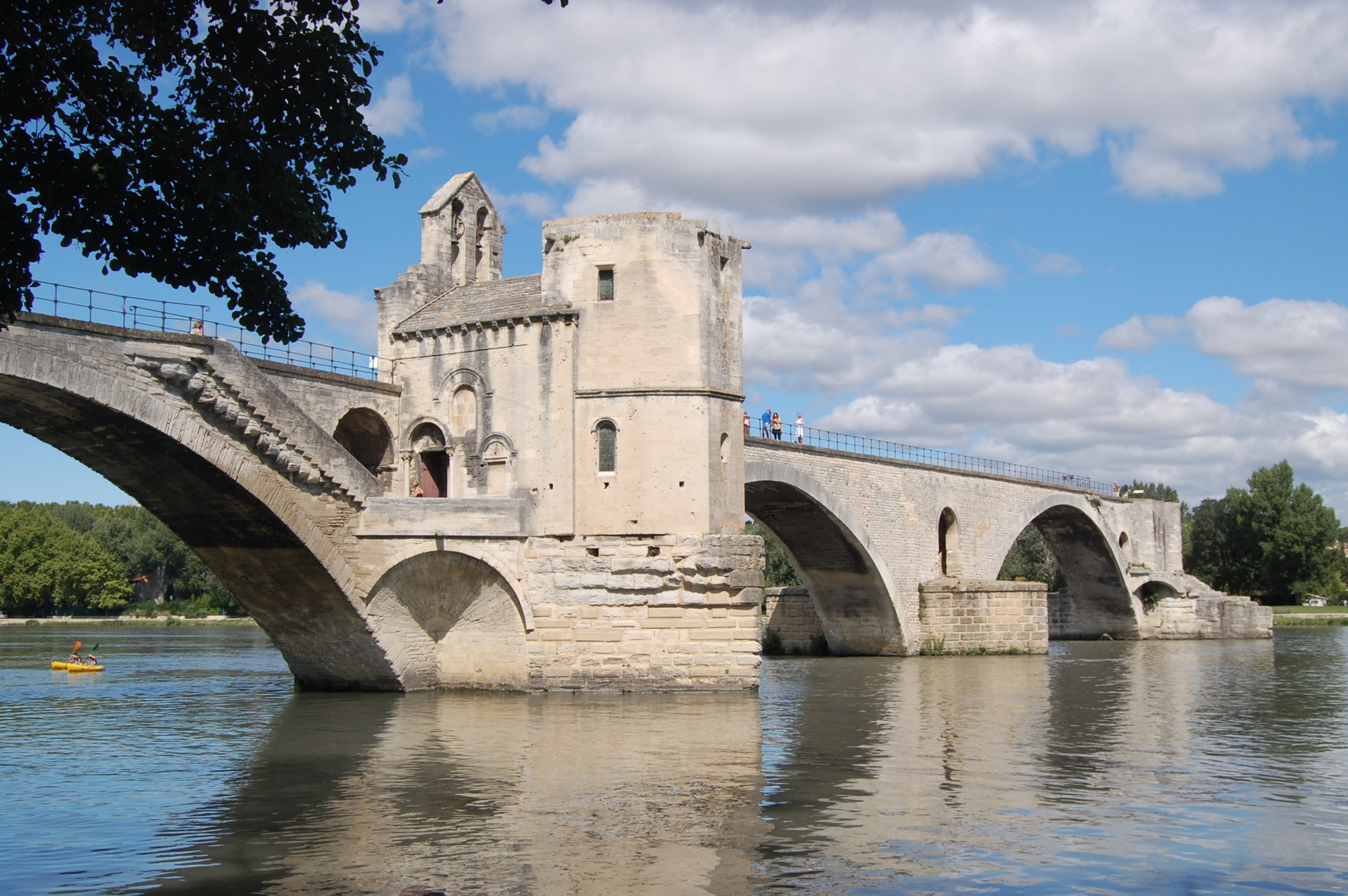
The 12th century Chapel of Saint Nicholas, built on a pier of the Pont Saint-Bénézet, Avignon

A bridge chapel is a small place of Christian worship, built either on, or immediately adjacent to, a road bridge; they were commonly established during pre-Reformation medieval era in Europe.

Although sometimes built on land at the very start of the bridge, bridge chapels were often built into the bridge structure itself, usually on one of the piers which had been made especially large for the purpose. These chapels were intended to minister to the spiritual needs of travellers passing over the bridge. Many were established as chantries, where a priest was employed to say masses for passers by and for the repose of the souls of the bridge's benefactors. In some instances, the priest would be responsible for collecting tolls from bridge users. The cost of maintaining a priest or chaplain could be very high, so some less well endowed bridges had a resident hermit, whose duties, including collecting tolls and working on repairs, were regarded as acts of religious devotion.

In England, the end of these institutions came with the Reformation, when the Abolition of Chantries Acts, 1545 and 1547 led either to their demolition or to their conversion to secular use.

== Some notable examples ==
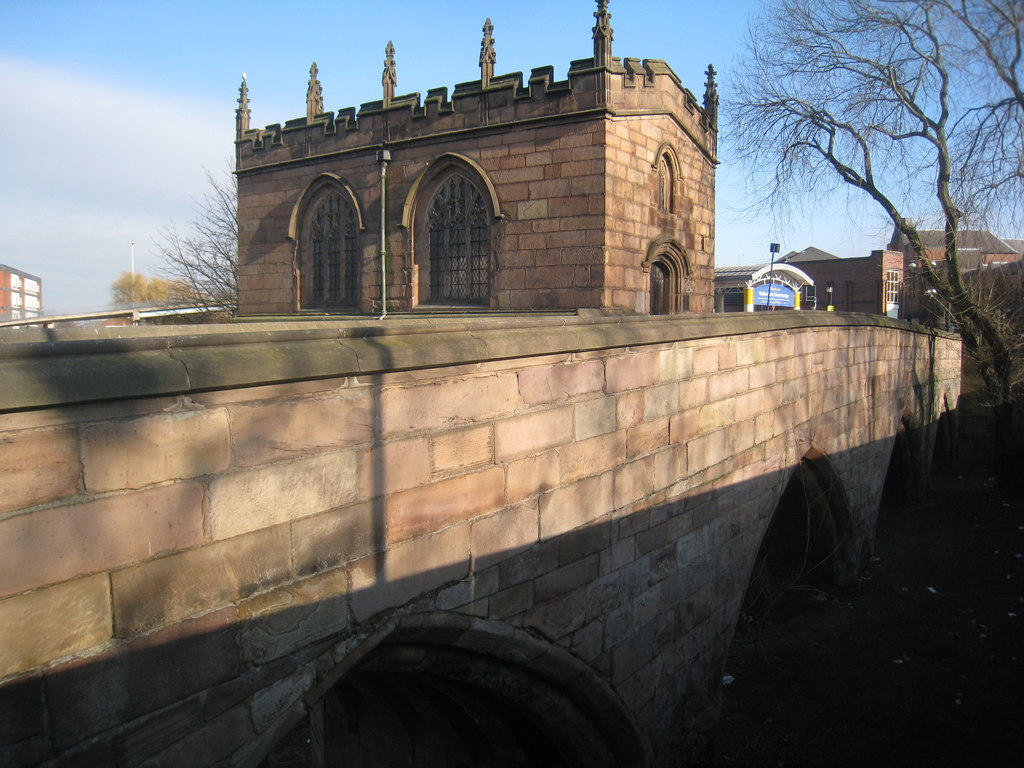
The Chapel of Our Lady of Rotherham Bridge in South Yorkshire

- Pont Saint-Bénézet, Avignon, France, Chapel of Saint Nicholas; 12th century, restored from 1878
- The Town Bridge, Bradford-on-Avon, England, a medieval chapel later rebuilt as a lock up
- Old Exe Bridge, Exeter, England, St Edmund on the Bridge; built c. 1200, rebuilt 1833 and demolished 1973 except the medieval tower.
- St Mary's Bridge Chapel, Derby, England; late 13th century, restored in 1930 as a place of worship
- Holzbrücke Rapperswil-Hurden, Switzerland, Heilig Hüsli; 15th century but rebuilt in stone in 1551
- Krämerbrücke, Erfurt, Germany, the Churches of St. Benedicti and St. Aegidien; the former was demolished in 1810
- High Bridge, Lincoln, England, Chapel of St Thomas Becket; built 1235 and demolished 1762
- "Old" London Bridge, England, Chapel of St Thomas on the Bridge, completed 1209, rebuilt as a grocer's shop in 1553, upper story demolished in 1747, bridge demolished in 1832
- Rochester Bridge Chapel, England: built in 1393, later a storeroom, private house, pub and shop. Restored in 1937 as a place of worship.
- Rotherham Bridge, England, the Chapel of Our Lady of Rotherham Bridge; built in 1483 and restored in 1927
- St Ives Bridge, England, the Chapel of St Leger; completed in 1426 and restored in 1930
- Chantry Bridge, Wakefield, England, the Chantry Chapel of St Mary the Virgin; completed in 1356 and restored in 1842

== See also ==
- Bridge tower
- Kapellbrücke
