= Old Bridge =

Old Bridge may refer to:

== Bridges ==
Bosnia and Herzegovina

- Stari Most, Mostar

Bulgaria

- Old Bridge, Svilengrad

Germany

- Alte Brücke (Frankfurt)
- Old Bridge (Heidelberg)

Iran

- Old Bridge of Dezful

Italy

- Ponte Vecchio, Florence

Mexico

- Brownsville & Matamoros International Bridge, also known as Old Bridge (Matamoros, Tamaulipas)

Slovakia

- Starý most (Bratislava)

Slovenia

- Kandija Bridge, Novo Mesto
- Old Bridge (Maribor)

Turkey

- Old Bridge, Hasankeyf

United Kingdom

- Old Bridge, Huntingdon, England
- Old Bridge, Bridgend, Wales
- Old Bridge, Pontypridd, Wales
- Hen Bont, Ponterwyd, Wales

United States

- Fort Benton Bridge, also known as Old Bridge (Fort Benton, Montana)
- Brownsville & Matamoros International Bridge, also known as Old Bridge (Brownsville, Texas)
- Old Iron Bridge (Bastrop, Texas)

== Other uses ==
- Old Bridge (CDP), New Jersey, a census-designated place in New Jersey, United States
- Old Bridge (unincorporated community), New Jersey, a community in East Brunswick, New Jersey, United States
  - Old Bridge Historic District, listed on the NRHP in Middlesex County, New Jersey, United States
- Old Bridge High School, in Old Bridge Township, New Jersey, United States
- Old Bridge Township, New Jersey, United States
- Operation Old Bridge, a series of arrests targeting organized crime in Italy and the United States

== See also ==
- Old Bridge Road (disambiguation)
- Ponte Vecchio (disambiguation)
- Stari Most (disambiguation)
- Stary Most (disambiguation)
