= Chantry Chapel of St Mary the Virgin, Wakefield =

Chantry Chapel of St Mary the Virgin
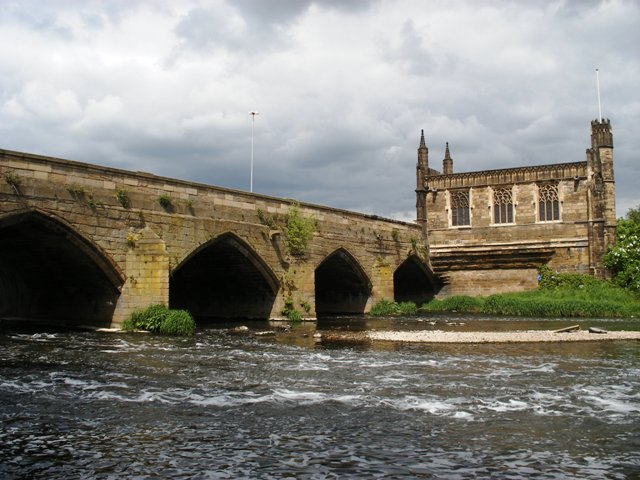

- Location in West Yorkshire
- 53°40′34″N 1°29′20″W
- Location: Wakefield, West Yorkshire, England

Listed Building – Grade I
- Official name: Chapel of St Mary on East Side of Wakefield Bridge
- Designated: 14 July 1953
- Reference no.: 1258242

The Chantry Chapel of St Mary the Virgin is a chantry chapel in Wakefield, West Yorkshire, England, and is designated a Grade I Listed building by Historic England. It is located south of the city centre on the medieval Chantry Bridge over the River Calder. It is the only survivor of four chantries in Wakefield and the oldest and most ornate of the surviving bridge chapels in England. Others are at St Ives (Cambridgeshire), Rotherham, Derby and Bradford-on-Avon. The chapel has had three west fronts, the original medieval façade having been removed to Kettlethorpe Hall in 1832. The medieval bridge is a scheduled ancient monument.

== History ==
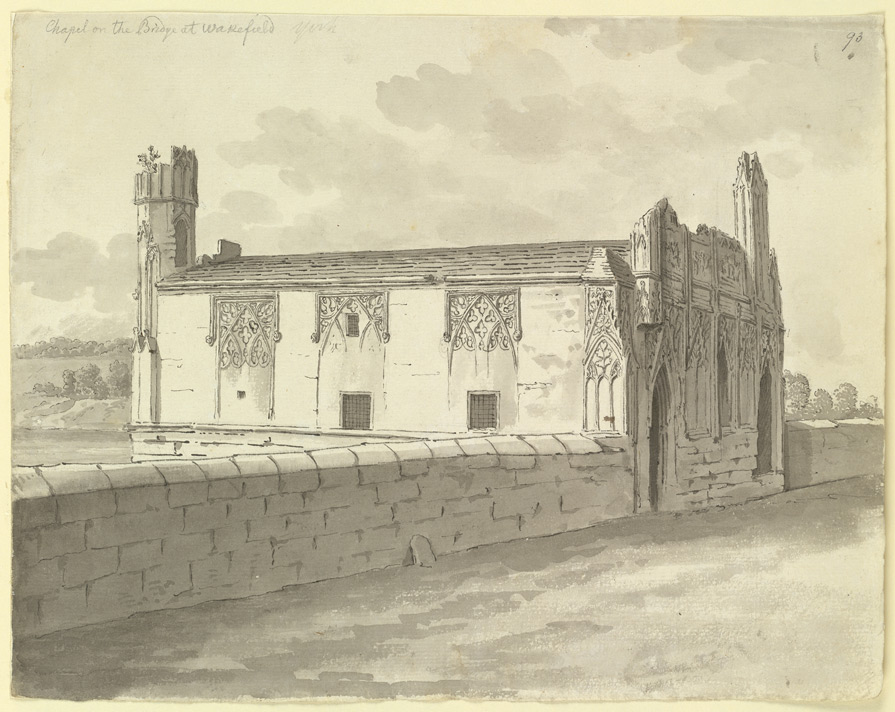
View of the Chantry Chapel, 1773, by Samuel Hieronymus Grimm

Wakefield had four chantry chapels, three of which dated from the 13th century. They were built outside the medieval town on the roads leading to Leeds, Dewsbury, York and Doncaster. The Chantry of St John the Baptist was on Northgate, the road to Leeds, where Wakefield Grammar School stands today. The Chapel of St Mary Magdalene was on Westgate where it crossed the Ings Beck on the road to Dewsbury. St Swithun's Chantry Chapel, on the York road, was near Clarke Hall. In the 14th century the Chantry Chapel of St Mary the Virgin was built on the medieval bridge across the River Calder on the road to Doncaster and the south.

Wakefield's medieval nine-arched bridge is 320 feet (98 m) long, was built in stone between 1342 and 1356. It replaced an earlier wooden structure on the site of an ancient ford. The chapel on the bridge was licensed in 1356. The Battle of Wakefield was fought about a mile south of the bridge in 1460 and the Earl of Rutland was killed near the bridge while attempting to escape.

The chapel was used for worship until the Reformation and Abolition of Chantries Acts when all Wakefield's four chantry chapels were closed. The bridge chapel survived because it is a structural element of the bridge. After closure it was used as a warehouse, library, office and cheese shop and survived bridge widening in 1758 and 1797. The bridge and its chapel were painted by artists including J. M. W. Turner whose watercolour dates from 1793.

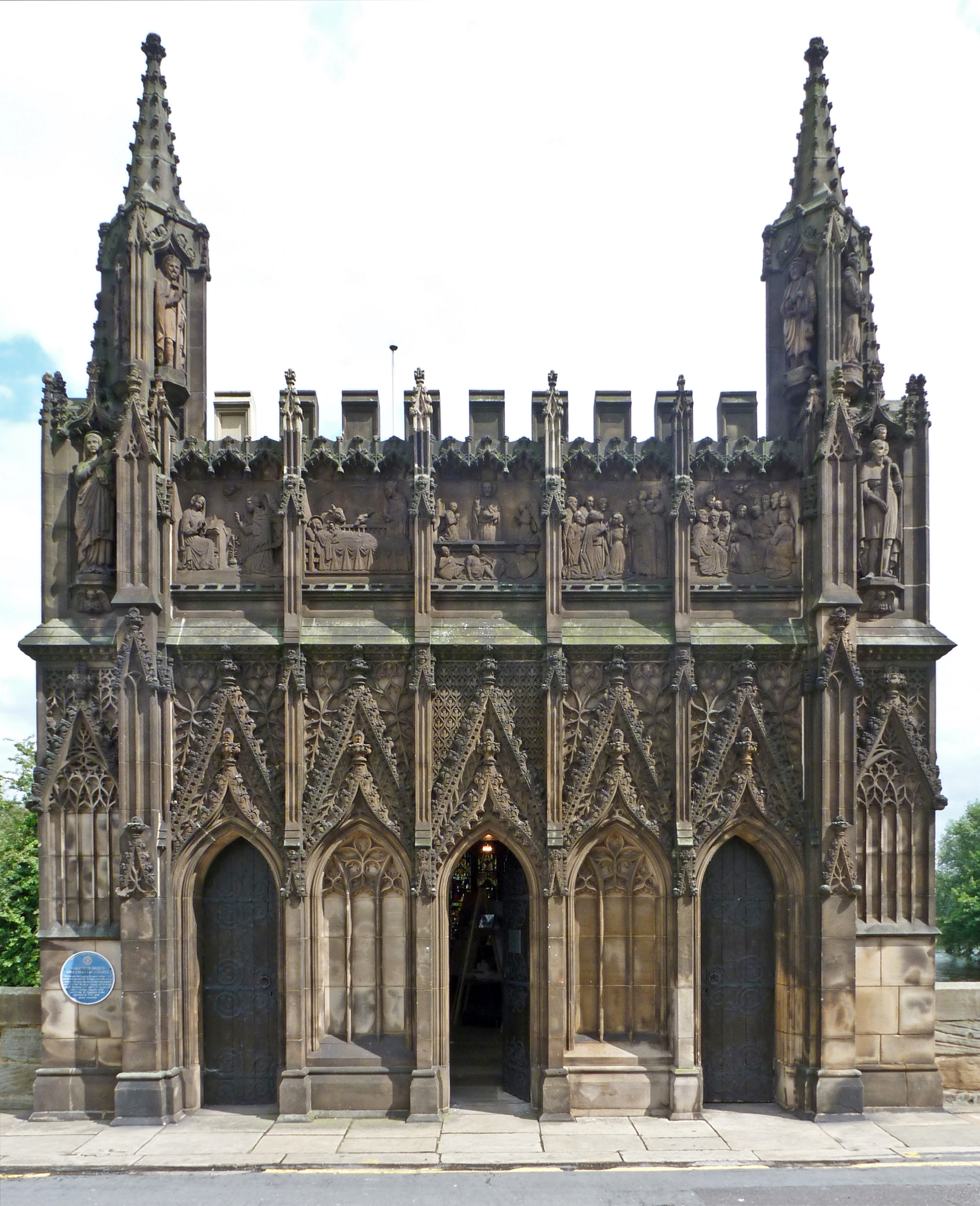
Chantry Chapel facade 2012

=== Restoration and rebuilding ===
The chapel was transferred to the Church of England in 1842 and the Yorkshire Architectural Society, influenced by the Oxford Movement, persuaded to undertake its restoration. The society, keen to restore medieval ecclesiastical remains, adopted designs by George Gilbert Scott. Restoration costing approximately £2,500 (equivalent to £240,000 in 2025), was carried out, resulting in the complete reconstruction of the chapel above pavement level. The new west front differed slightly from its medieval predecessor. Scott is perceived as having made two errors, the first was being persuaded to completely replace the old west front. The second was having the new façade carved from Caen stone, which crumbled in the polluted urban atmosphere and was completely replaced in 1939 in gritstone by ecclesiastical architect Sir Charles Nicholson. The original richly carved medieval façade was moved to Kettlethorpe Hall, where it became the frontage to a folly boathouse. In 1996, the remains of the boathouse were removed from the grounds of Kettlethorpe Hall by Wakefield Council, who put it into storage. In 2014, they were erected in Thornes Park in Wakefield.

The chapel opened for Anglican worship in 1848 and was used as the parish church of the newly formed ecclesiastical district of St Mary until a church was built in 1854. The bridge chapel became a chapel-of-ease and services were held irregularly. St Mary's merged with St Andrew's, Eastmoor in the 1960s and the impoverished parish struggled with the chapel's upkeep. In the 1980s it seemed likely the chapel would be declared redundant by the Church of England. In January 2000 a parish boundary change brought the chantry into the care of Wakefield Cathedral.

== Structure ==
The chapel which projects to the east side of the bridge is built into on a small island in the river and its base is a structural element of the bridge. It is rectangular in plan and was built of ashlar sandstone possibly from a quarry at Goodybower. The chapel measures 50 feet (15 m) by 25 feet (8 m). It measures 36 feet (11 m) to the top of the battlements at the eastern end. The chapel is at street level and has a lower chamber, the sacristy, accessed by a spiral staircase at the east end.

=== Exterior ===
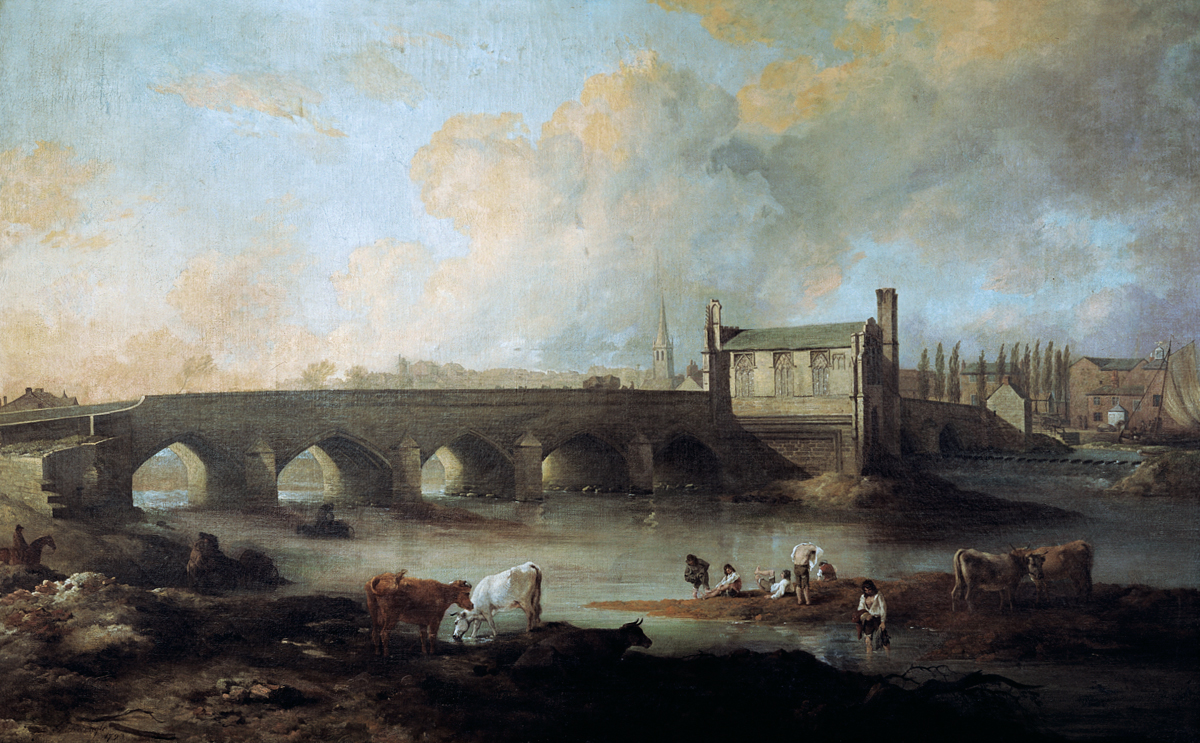
Wakefield Bridge and Chantry Chapel, by Philip Reinagle, 1793.

The chapel's west front has buttresses at either end and has three narrow doorways. Its façade is divided into five elaborately carved panels. The panels originally represented the Annunciation, the Nativity, the Resurrection, the Ascension and the Coronation of the Virgin, but the fifth panel was replaced by the Descent of the Holy Ghost when it was restored. There are three bays with square-headed windows with "flamboyant" tracery. The chapel has octagonal corner pinnacles and at the north-eastern corner there is a small embattled octagonal turret with a small bell tower, which originally contained two bells.

=== Interior ===
In the north east corner a newel staircase leads to the roof. A staircase also descends to a small crypt in the basement of the building. Four of the seven traceried windows have stained glass, the east window, two south windows and one north window.

== Friends of Wakefield Chantry Chapel ==
The "Friends of Wakefield Chantry Chapel" was formed in 1991 by members of the Wakefield Historical Society, Wakefield Civic Society and members of St Andrew's Church to raise funds to repair the chapel roof and re-point the stonework. A programme of conservation work has since been carried out with the approval of English Heritage. The work included roof repairs, re-wiring and the installation of heating. Renewal to the external stonework cost £30,000 in a project by William Anelay Ltd. Six new carved stone heads were made for the south side of the building. At the suggestion of architect David Greenwood, the Bishop of Wakefield, the Lady St Oswald of Nostell Priory, the Rt Hon Walter Harrison and Canon Bryan Ellis allowed their features to be sculpted by stonemason John Schofield. The fifth head is that of a founder of the Friends, Ray Perraudin, and the sixth one of Anelay's workmen. The friends have conserved the internal stone heads whose age is unknown.

== See also ==
- Grade I listed churches in West Yorkshire
- Listed buildings in Wakefield
- Rotherham Bridge
- St Ives Bridge (Cambridgeshire)
- St Mary's Bridge Chapel (Derby)
