= Stary Most =

Stary Most may refer to:

- Stary Most, Pomeranian Voivodeship, a village in Poland
- Starý most (Bratislava), a bridge in Bratislava, Slovakia

== See also ==
- Old Bridge (disambiguation)
- Stari Most (disambiguation)
