= St Mary's Bridge Chapel =

Chapel on a bridge in Derby, England

Coordinates: 52.9271°N 1.4758°W

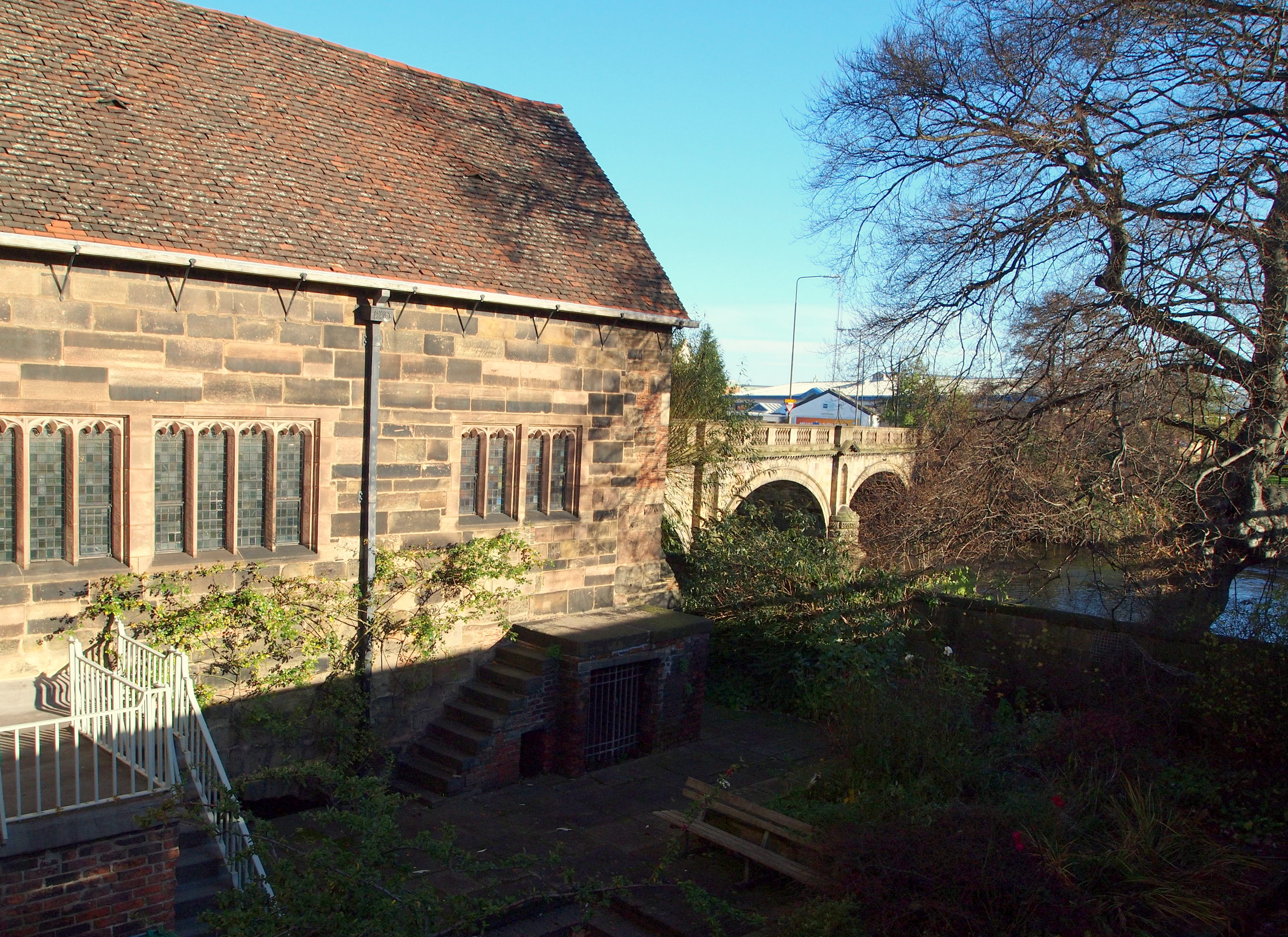
The Bridge Chapel from the southwest with St Mary's Bridge behind

St Mary's Bridge Chapel is a Church of England chapel in Derby, England. It is a bridge chapel, one of only a small number of medieval age that survive in England. It is a Grade I listed building.

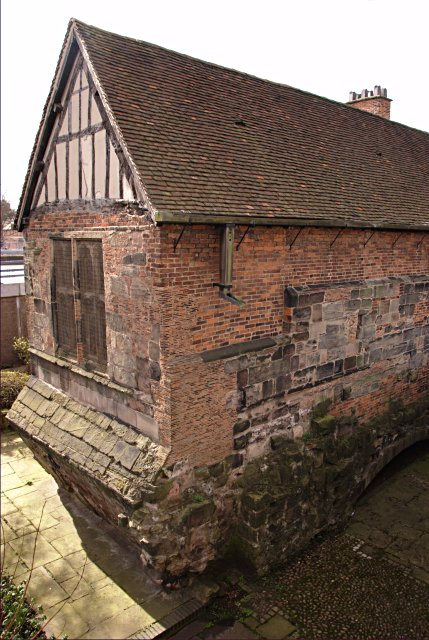
View from the northeast, showing the remnant of the arch of the medieval bridge

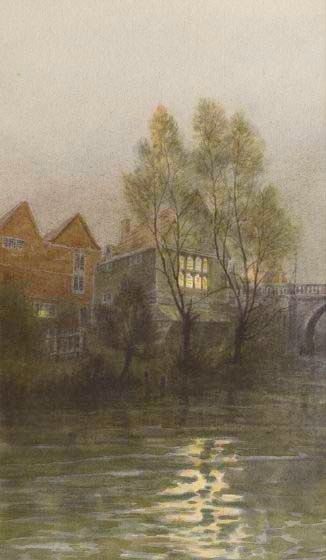
St Mary's Bridge by A. J. Keene

The Chapel of St Mary on the Bridge, commonly known as the Bridge Chapel, was built on the first arch of a medieval bridge over the River Derwent; the springing of the arch can be seen below the east wall. It now stands beside the 18th-century St Mary's Bridge, which replaced the medieval bridge.

The precise date when the first bridge chapel came into existence is uncertain, but it is likely to have been the late 13th or early 14th century. The south elevation has a timber-framed gable over a 15th-century stone-mullioned window with modern leaded lights. The original building was of stone, but some restoration is in brick with tile slips. The interior is small and aisleless. The north wall has a lychnoscope.

It is one of only six bridge chapels left in England. The building has had other uses including as a prison and a carpenter's workshop. It was restored in 1930 in memory of Alfred Seale Haslam, a former Mayor of Derby, using funds from his family.

An incised slate tablet on the north side records the names of three Catholic priests, Nicholas Garlick, Robert Ludlum and Richard Simpson, who on 24 July 1588 were martyred near here.

Although it remains in Anglican ownership, the building is also used for worship by Lutheran (Latvian and German-speaking) and Russian Orthodox congregations.

The adjacent St Mary's Bridge (1788–93, designed by Thomas Harrison) is a Grade II* listed structure and scheduled monument, and Bridge Chapel House (or St Mary's Bridge House, No. 86, Bridge Gate) is listed at Grade II.

== See also ==
- Chantry Chapel of St Mary the Virgin, Wakefield
- Rotherham Bridge
- St Ives Bridge (Cambridgeshire)
