= Stari Most (disambiguation) =

Stari Most may refer to:

- Stari Most, the 'old bridge' in Mostar, Bosnia and Herzegovina
- Old Bridge (Maribor) (Slovene: Stari most), in Maribor, Slovenia
- Stari most, a former bridge in Ljubljana, Slovenia; see Triple Bridge
- Stari most na Ribnici, the Old Bridge over the Ribnica river, now known as Adži-paša's bridge

== See also ==
- Old Bridge (disambiguation)
- Stary Most (disambiguation)
