= Bridge tower =

Fortification for a bridge

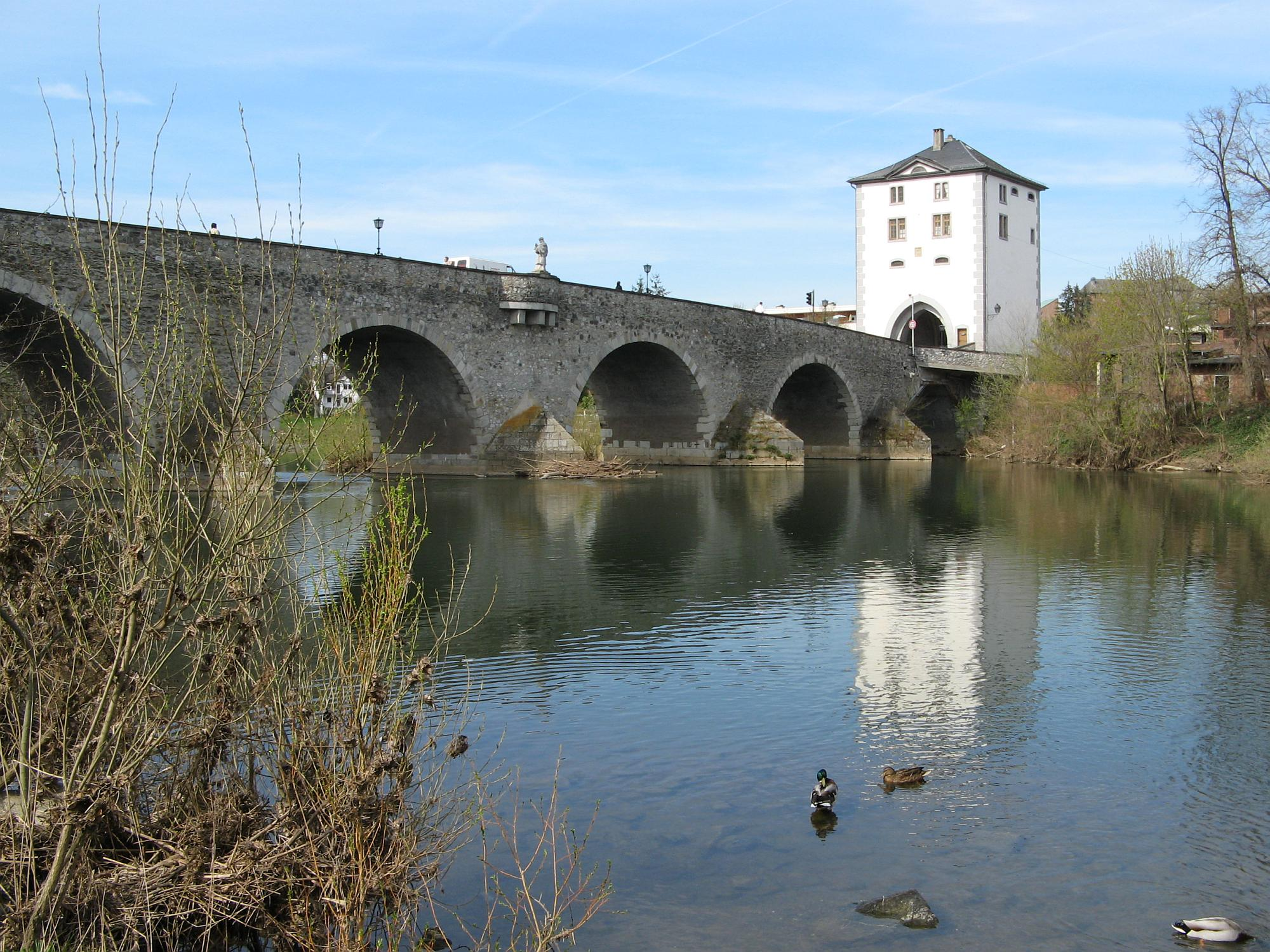
The Old Lahn Bridge in Limburg an der Lahn with its surviving bridge tower

A bridge tower (German: Brückenturm) was a type of fortified tower built on a bridge. They were typically built in the period up to early modern times as part of a city or town wall or castle. There is usually a tower at both ends of the bridge. During the 19th century, a number of bridge towers were built in the Gothic Revival style – Tower Bridge in London is perhaps the best known example; however, many original medieval towers survive across Europe.

== Function ==
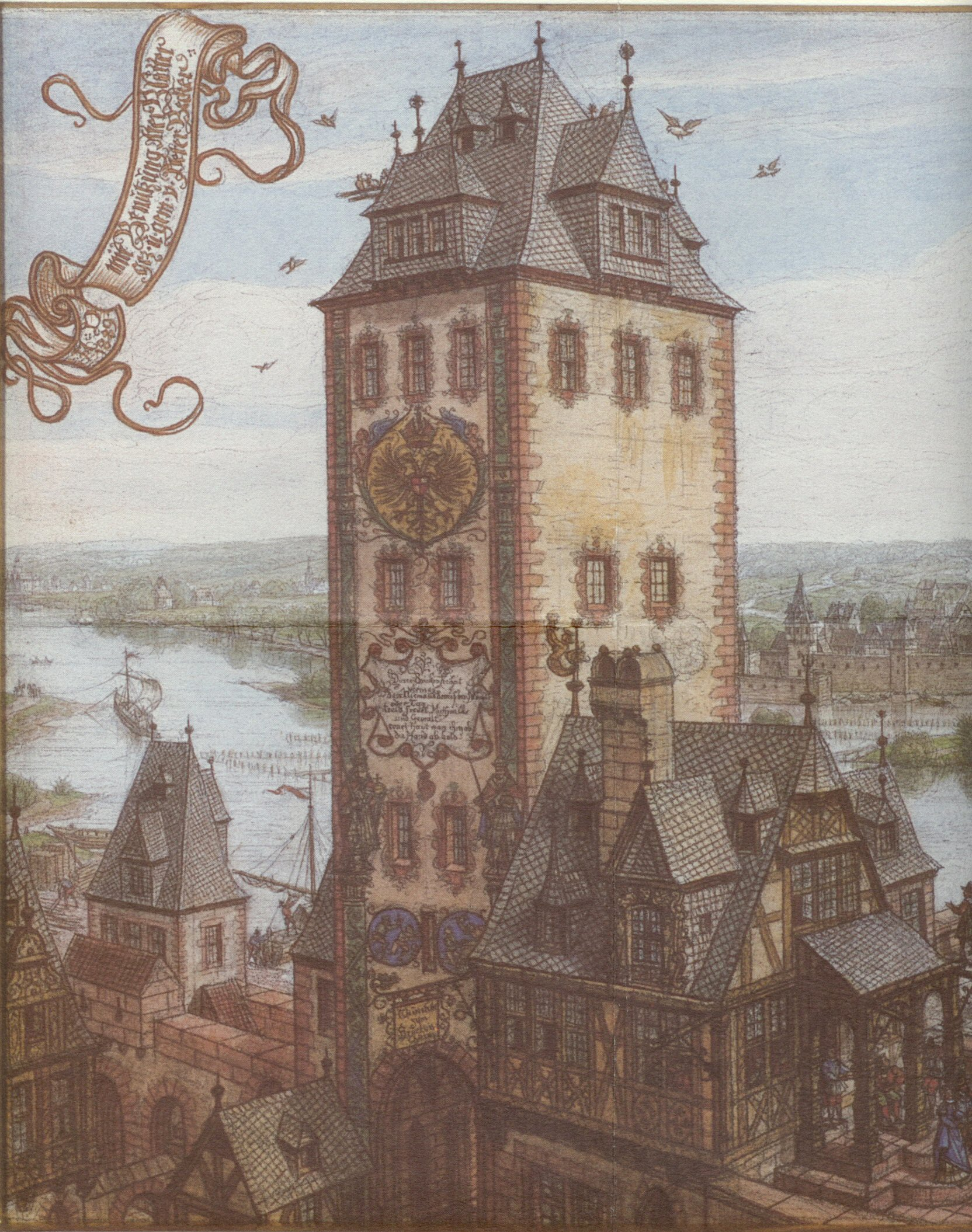
Bridge tower on the Old Bridge in Frankfurt am Main around 1600

These towers were built in pre-medieval and medieval times to guard access to the bridge and to enable the charging of tolls on important roads crossing rivers, usually near towns and cities. The rivers were often part of the defences of these settlements. As a result, it was important from a defensive perspective that the bridges did not allow attacking enemies to break in. The bridges acted as a bulwark and often had a small drawbridge. In addition to their genuine protective and defensive functions they also played a symbolic and architectural role. Often these towers were the first public buildings that the travellers saw when approaching the city.

Sometimes, the same building served as bridge tower and bridge chapel, for example at the Krämerbrücke in Erfurt.

The high cost of such towers was usually paid for by charging tolls. The gates of bridge towers were closed at night, so that no-one could cross the bridge during silent hours.

They were relatively common in medieval France, but much rarer in England where Warkworth Bridge is one of the few examples.

== Surviving bridge towers ==
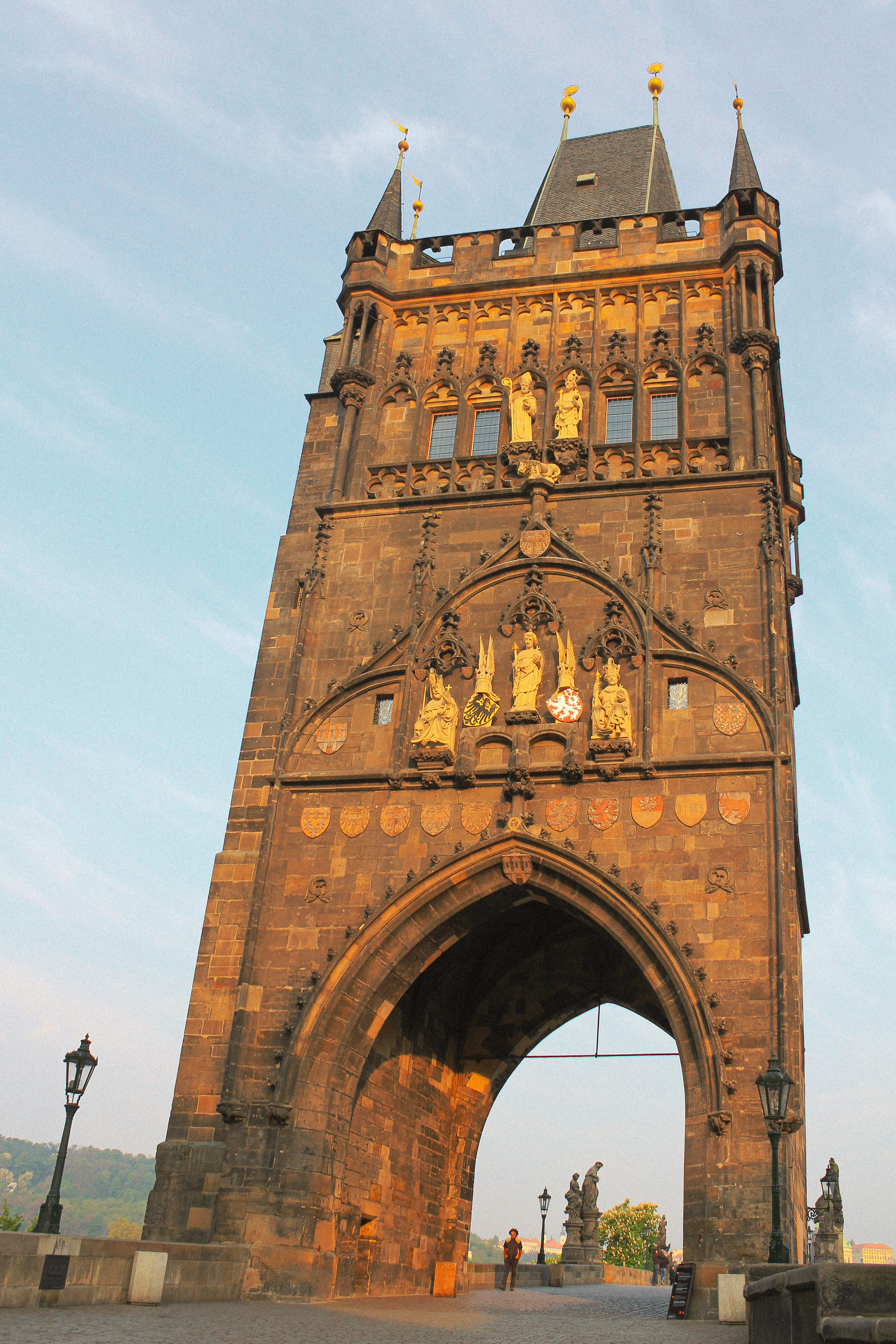
The 1357 Old Town Tower on Charles Bridge in Prague.

=== Bosnia and Herzegovina ===
- The Halebija Tower the Tara Tower on the Stari Most at Mostar, Bosnia and Herzegovina (completed 1567)

=== Czech Republic ===
- The Old Town and Lesser Quarter bridge towers on the Charles Bridge in Prague, Czech Republic (built 1357)
- Bridge tower in Stříbro (Mies), Czech Republic (built 1555)

=== France ===
- Pont Saint-Bénézet at Avignon, France.
- Le Pont Vieux at Sospel, France.
- Le Pont Vieux at Orthez, France.
- Pont Valentré, Cahors, France.

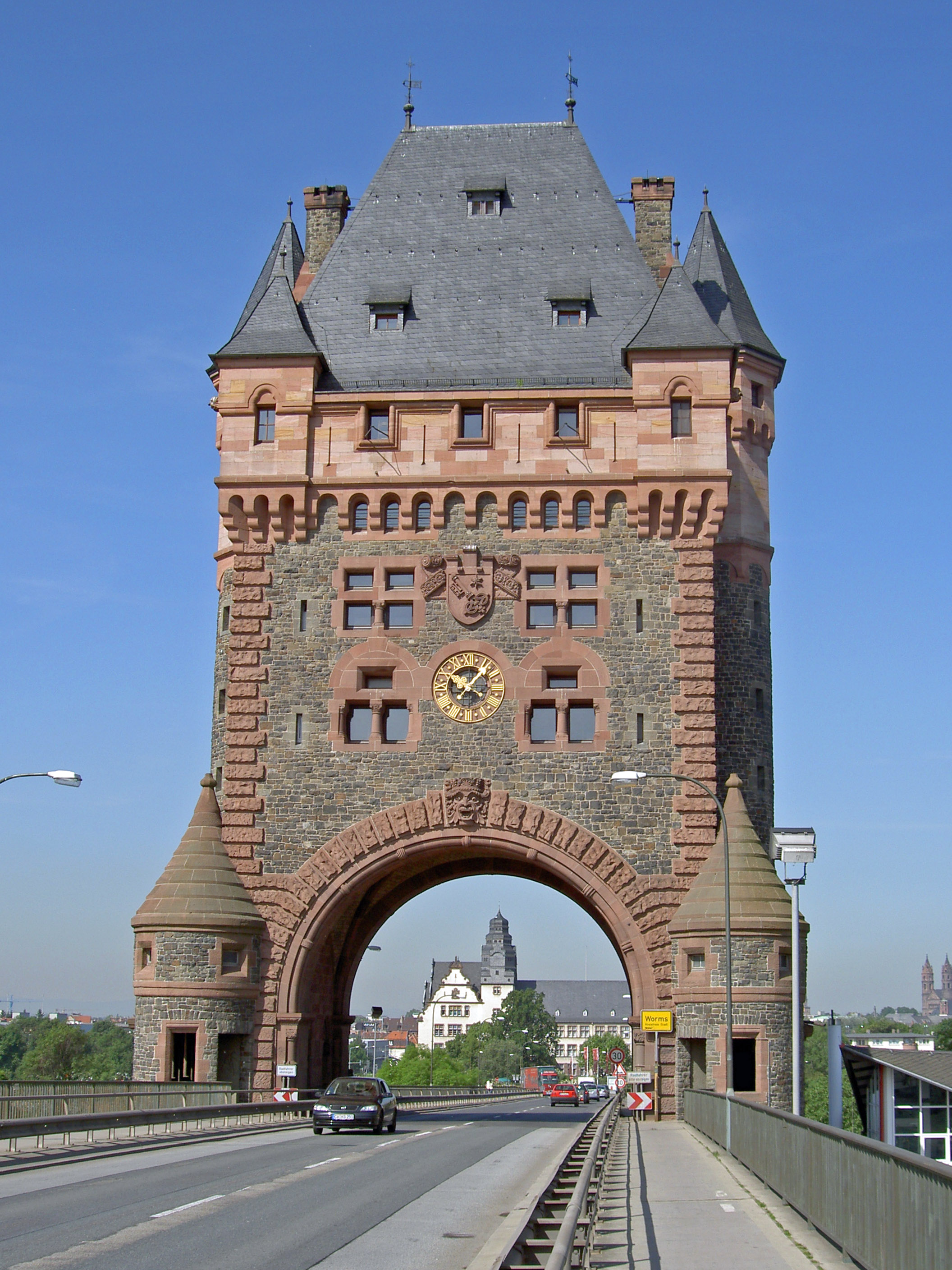
The late 19th century Bridge tower on the Nibelungen Bridge in Worms

=== Germany ===
- Bridge tower of the stone bridge in Regensburg (built before the 13th century)
- Medieval tower on the Old Lahn Bridge in Limburg an der Lahn (built 1315–1354)
- Bridge Gate in Heidelberg (15th century, remodelled 1786–88)
- Towers on the South Bridge in Mainz (built 1860–1862)
- Neo-Romanesque tower, Nibelungenturm, of the Nibelungen Bridge in Worms (built 1897–1900)
- Bridge Gate in Traben-Trarbach (built 1899)
- Portal of the Old Hamburg Elbe Bridge (built 1899)
- Bridge gate in Miltenberg (built 1900)
- Tower of the Friedrich Ebert Bridge in Duisburg (built 1904–1907)

=== Italy ===
- The tower of the Ponte Milvio in Rome, Italy
- Castelvecchio Bridge, Verona, Italy

=== Luxembourg ===
- The Porte d'Eich (de) and Porte des Bons-Malades (de) gate towers on the Vauban-designed fortified pedestrian bridge, Béinchen (de) (built 1864–1865), part of the UNESCO protected former fortifications of Luxembourg City

=== Portugal ===
- The tower of Ucanha Bridge

=== Spain ===
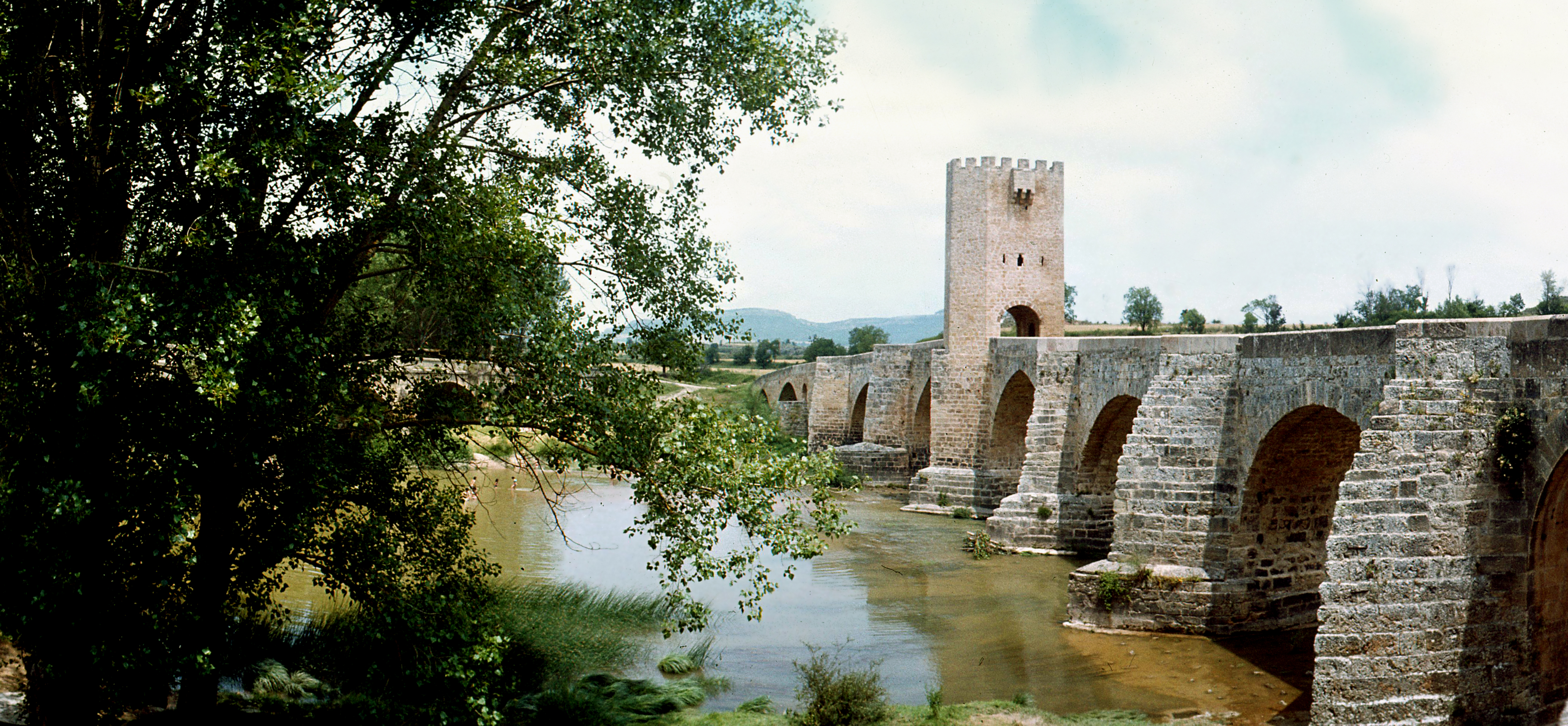
Puente de Frías, 14th century, crossing the River Ebro in Spain.

- Pont de Besalú, Besalú, Catalonia, Spain.
- Puente de Alcántara, Toledo, Spain.
- Puente de Frías, Frías, Province of Burgos, Castile and León, Spain
- Puente de San Martín, Toledo, Spain.

=== Switzerland ===
- The Wasserturm ("Water Tower"), part of the Kapellbrücke complex in Lucerne, Switzerland.

=== United Kingdom ===
- The Monnow Gate on the Monnow Bridge at Monmouth, Wales (late 13th or early 14th century)

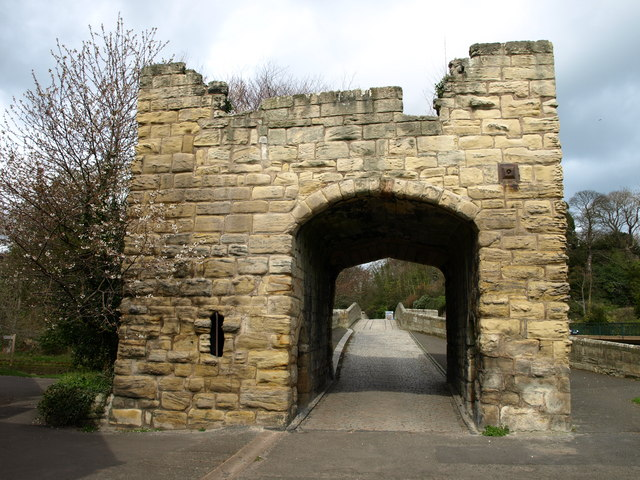
The 14th century Warkworth Bridge.

- The bridge tower at Warkworth Bridge in Warkworth, England (late 14th century).
- Tower Bridge in London, England (built 1894). The actual function of these towers is to support a high-level walkway.

== See also ==
- Bridge chapel
- Gate tower
- Gatehouse
