= Peter of Colechurch =

12th-century chaplain and architect

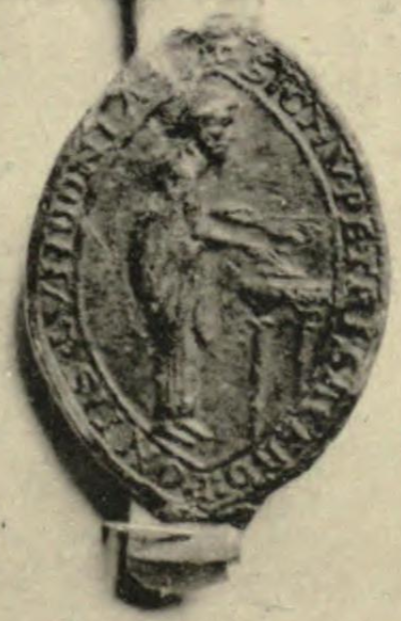
- Seal of Peter of Colechurch, depicting Peter at an altar saying mass.
- Other names: Peter of Colecherche, Peter de Colechurch, Petrus capellanus de Colechurch
- Occupations: architect, chaplain
- Notable work: Old London Bridge

Peter of Colechurch (fl. 1176 – d. 1205) was the chaplain of St. Mary Colechurch and the architect of the Old London Bridge.

Very little is known about Peter's life. He may have been a native of London, although he may have been from Colkirk. He is sometimes associated with the building of a bridge across the River Thames out of elm in 1163, although whether it was Peter of Colechurch or another architect is disputed.

Peter is definitively known to have participated in the construction of the first stone bridge across the River Thames as an architect and financier of the project. Specifically, he designed the arch structure and the Chapel of St Thomas on the Bridge, the latter of which was financed by Peter himself. By 1202, Peter was replaced with Isembert, a French monk, as architect of the bridge project. When Peter died in 1205, four years before the bridge's completion, he was interred in the chapel's crypt. Bones were found under the floor of the chapel when Old London Bridge was dismantled in 1832 which were presumed to be Peter's, but those bones have since been lost.
