= Kapellbrücke =

Bridge across the Reuss River in Lucerne, Switzerland

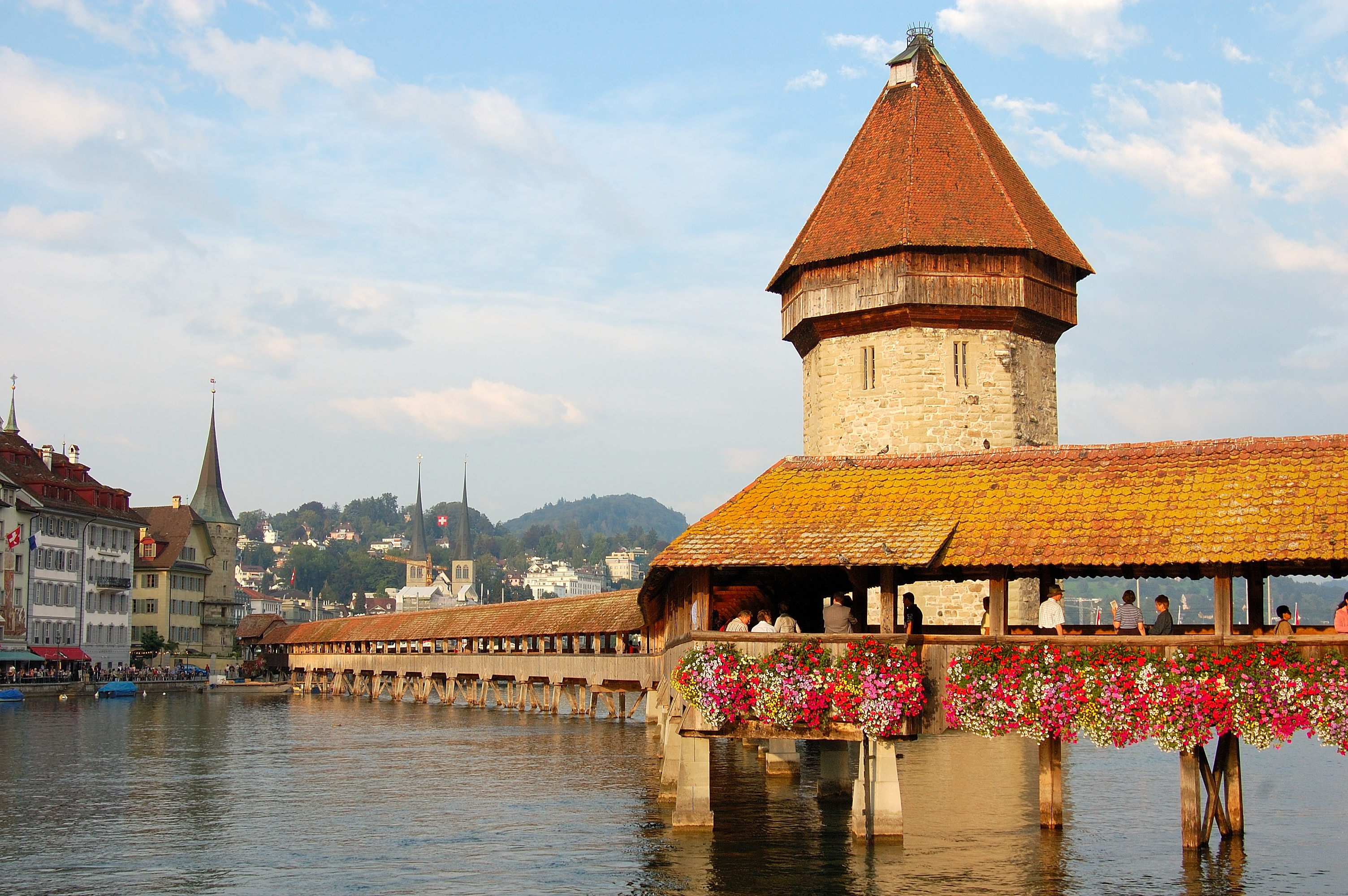
- The Kapellbrücke in Lucerne with its Wasserturm (water tower) seen in the middle.
- Coordinates: 47°03′06″N 8°18′27″E
- Carried: Pedestrian
- Crossed: Reuss
- Locale: Lucerne, Switzerland
- Began: Kapellplatz/Rosengart-Platz, Altstadt
- Ended: Bahnhofstrasse/Theaterplatz
- Other name(s): Chapel Bridge
- Named for: Named after St. Peter's Chapel
- Owner: City of Lucerne
- Heritage status: Cultural Property of National Significance
- Website: chapel-bridge.ch
- Preceded by: Seebrücke
- Followed by: Rathaussteg

Characteristics
- Design: Covered Wooden Footbridge
- Material: Wood
- Trough construction: Wood
- Pier construction: Wood (20), stone (8)
- Total length: 204.7 m (672 ft)
- No. of spans: 27
- Piers in water: 28

History
- Built: c. 1360
- Rebuilt: April 14, 1994
- Destroyed: August 18, 1993

Statistics
- Daily traffic: 13,800 (2017)

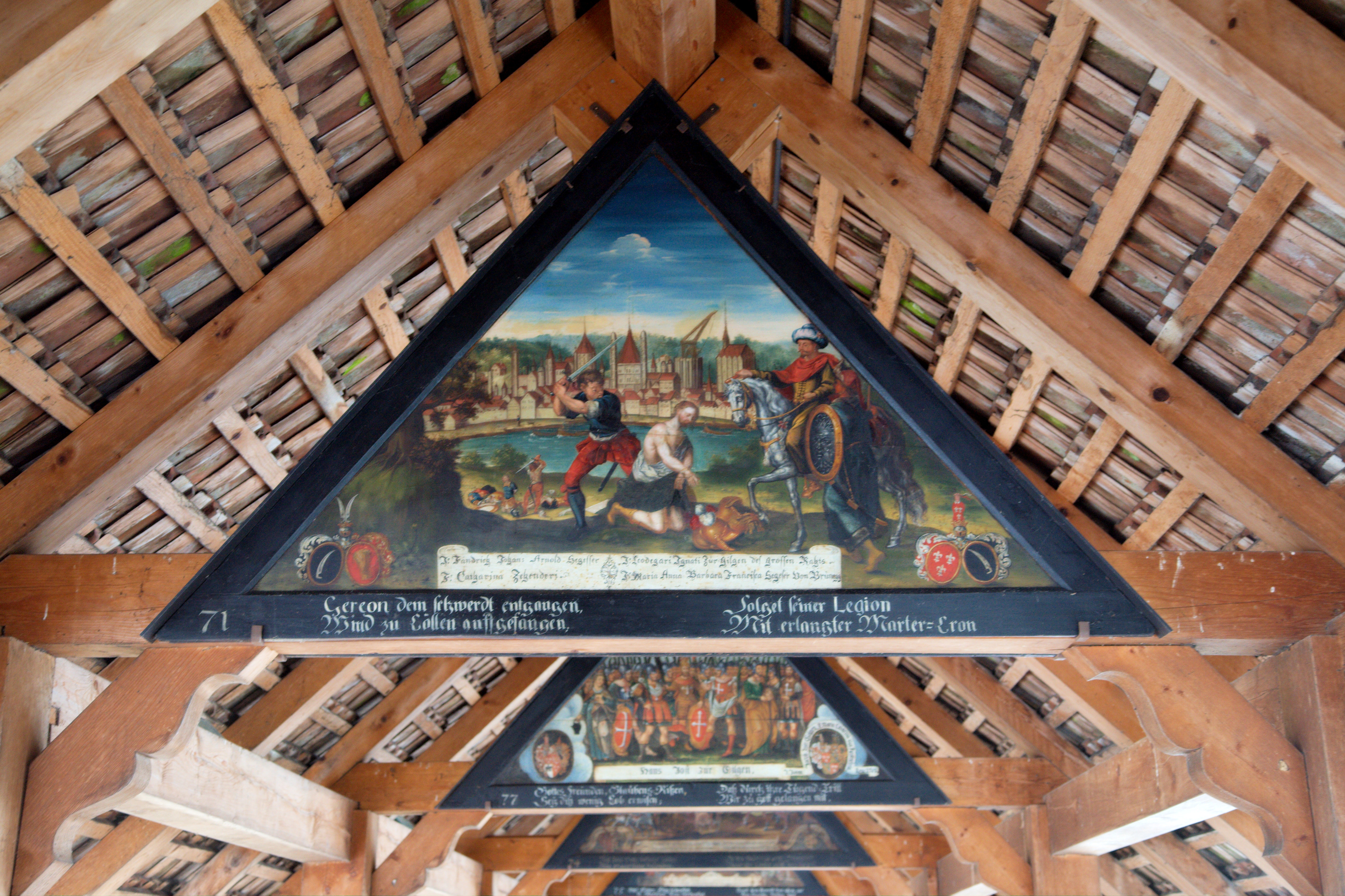
One of the restored interior paintings; this one depicts a local slaying.

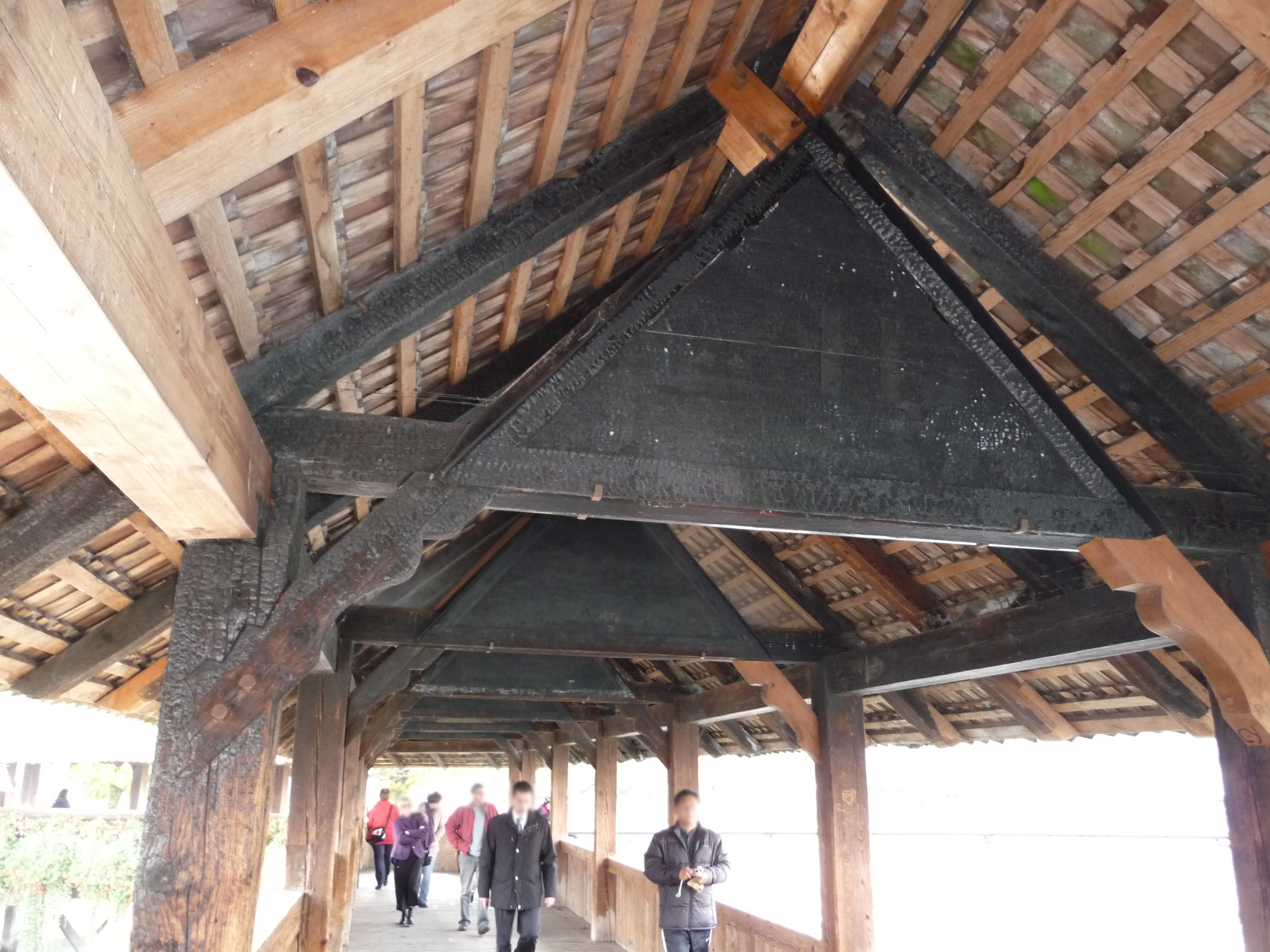
The 1993 fire damage is still evident in the reconstructed Kapellbrücke.

The Kapellbrücke (from German 'Chapel Bridge') is a covered wooden footbridge spanning the river Reuss diagonally in the city of Lucerne in central Switzerland. Named after the nearby St. Peter's Chapel, the bridge is unique in containing a number of interior paintings dating back to the 17th century, although many of them were destroyed along with a larger part of the centuries-old bridge in a 1993 fire. Subsequently restored, the Kapellbrücke is the oldest wooden covered bridge in Europe, as well as the world's oldest surviving truss bridge. It serves as the city's symbol and as one of Switzerland's main tourist attractions.

== History ==
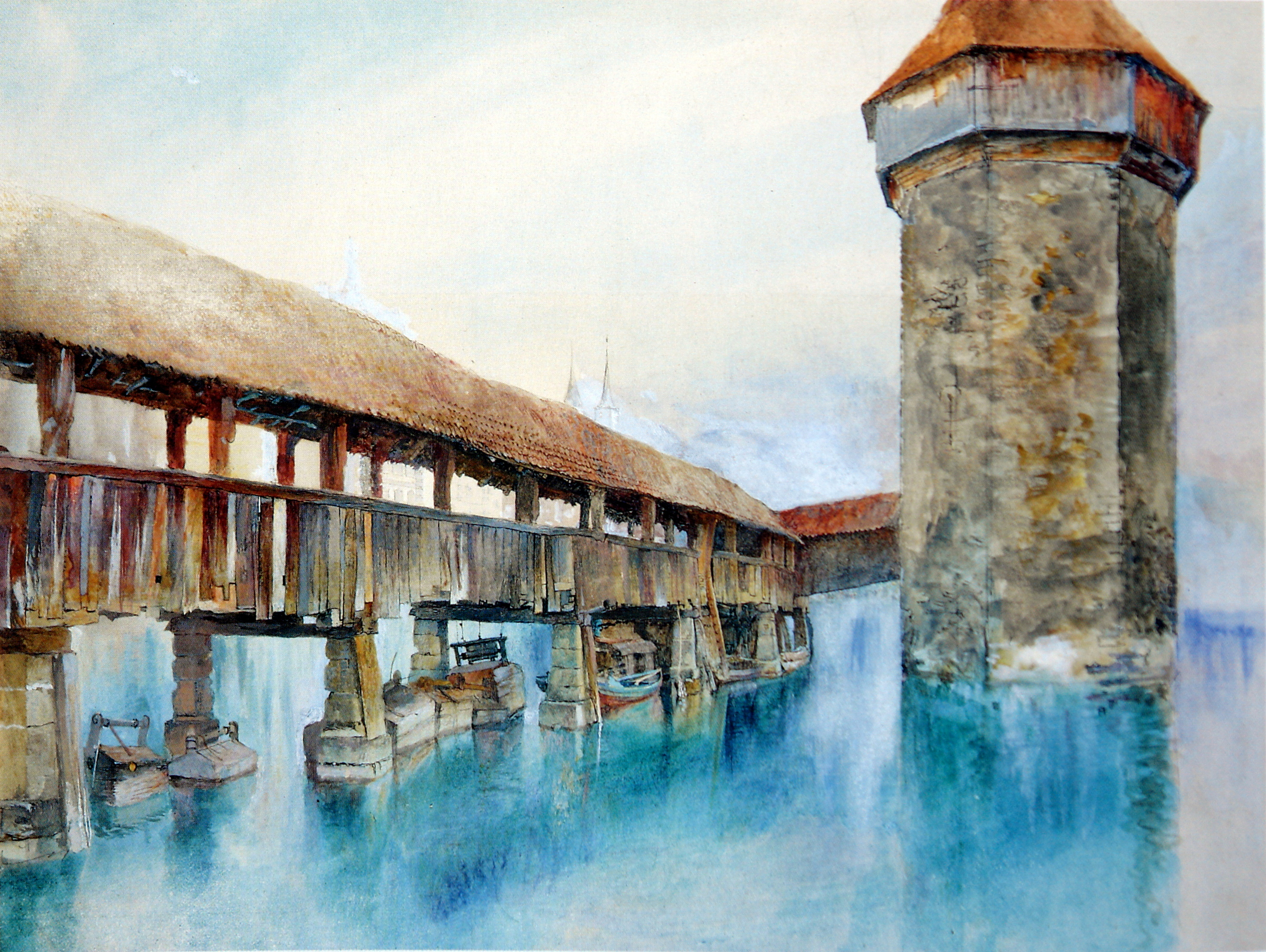
Painting by John Ruskin in 1861, Pencil, watercolour and bodycolour

Part of the bridge complex is the octagonal 34.5 m (113 ft) tall (from ground) "Wasserturm", which translates to "water tower," in the sense of "tower standing in the water." The tower pre-dated the bridge by about 30 years. Over the centuries, the tower has been used as a prison, torture chamber, and later a municipal archive as well as a local treasury. Today, the tower is closed to the public, although it houses a local artillery association and a tourist gift shop.

The bridge itself was originally built c.1365 as part of Lucerne's fortifications. It linked the old town on the right bank of the Reuss to the new town on the left bank, securing the town from attack from the south (i.e. from the lake). The bridge was initially over 270 metres (890 ft) long, although numerous shortenings over the years and river bank replenishments mean the bridge now totals only 204.7 metres (672 ft) long. It is the oldest surviving truss bridge in the world, consisting of strutted and triangulated trusses of moderate span, supported on piled trestles; as such, it is probably an evolution of the strutted bridge.

The Kapellbrücke almost burned down on 18 August 1993, destroying two thirds of its interior paintings. Shortly thereafter, the Kapellbrücke was reconstructed and again opened to the public on 14 April 1994 for a total of CHF 3.4 million.

== Paintings ==
Lucerne is unique in that its three wooden pedestrian bridges, the 14th-century Hofbrücke (now destroyed) and Kapellbrücke and the 16th-century Spreuerbrücke, all featured painted interior triangular frames. None of Europe's other wooden footbridges have this feature. The paintings, dating back to the 17th century and executed by local Catholic painter Hans Heinrich Wägmann, depict events from Lucerne's history. Of the original 158 paintings, 147 existed before the 1993 fire. After the fire, the remains of 47 paintings were collected, but ultimately only 30 were fully restored.

The wooden boards that held the paintings varied from 150 centimetres (59 in) to 181 centimetres (71 in) wide and 85 centimetres (33 in) to 95 centimetres (37 in) wide. Most of the panels were made from spruce wood boards, and only a few were made from linden wood and maple. The paintings were created during the Counter-Reformation, featuring scenes promoting the Catholic Church. The paintings were sponsored by the city's council members, who, upon sponsoring a panel, were allowed to attribute their personal coat of arms on it. An explanation of each painting was printed below each scene. The paintings ran all along the bridge, dating from the life and death of Lucerne's patron saint St. Leger to the legends of the city's other patron saint St. Maurice.

== See also ==
- Bridge chapel
- Bridge tower
