= Old Bridge, Bridgend =

Old Bridge
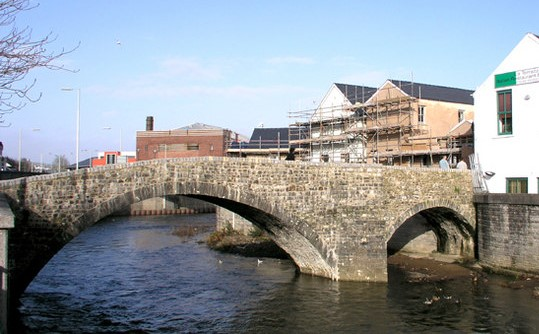
- Yr Hen Bont
- Coordinates: 51°30′24″N 3°34′49″W
- Carries: Pedestrians
- Crosses: River Ogmore
- Locale: Bridgend, Wales
- Maintained by: Bridgend County Borough

Characteristics
- Design: Arch bridge
- Width: 2.6 m (8.5 ft)
- Longest span: 13.7 m (45 ft)

History
- Opened: c. 1425

Statistics
- Toll: Free

Scheduled monument
- Official name: Bridgend Old Bridge
- Reference no.: GM049

Listed Building – Grade II*
- Official name: Old Bridge
- Designated: 29 September 1986
- Reference no.: 11303

The Old Bridge (Welsh: Yr Hen Bont) is a medieval two arched stone footbridge that spans the River Ogmore at Bridgend in Wales. It is not known who designed or built the bridge, however it was built in approximately 1425. The bridge was repaired in 1775 and restored both in 2005 and 2011. The bridge is a scheduled ancient monument and a grade II* listed bridge.

== History and construction ==
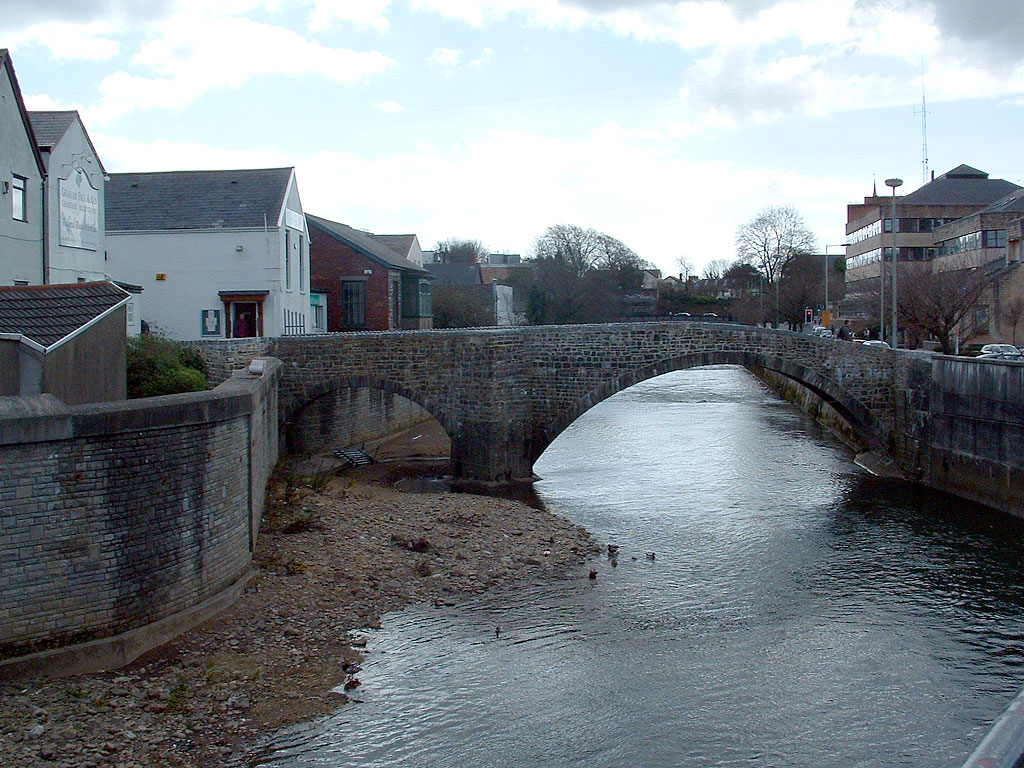
The Old Bridge looking south

The Old Bridge replaced an earlier medieval structure spanning the River Ogmore. The name of Bridgend in Welsh is Pen-y-bont ar Ogwr, which means "the head of the bridge on the Ogmore". Pilgrims would have used the bridge to cross the River Ogmore on their way to St David's Cathedral.

The stone bridge is believed to have been built around 1425 with five spans. It is not known who designed and built the bridge. The five-span structure had three river arches and smaller flood arches on each bank. On 21 August 1775, the western pier had been demolished due to a flood, which partially destroyed two arches on that side of the bridge. The arches were then rebuilt as a single arch of double span.

The two visible arches span 13.7 m (45 ft) on the western side and 6.9 m (23 ft) on the eastern side of the bridge. A third arch is only visible in the rear yard of an office building, built around 1830. In early 2015, the fourth arch of bridge was discovered for the first time in hundreds of years within Cariads Cwtch Apothecary 12 Dunraven Place. It was found behind a wall in the basement of the same office.A small port hole has been made by Cariads Cwtch Apothecary to be able to see part of the old stone Bridge structure in the property

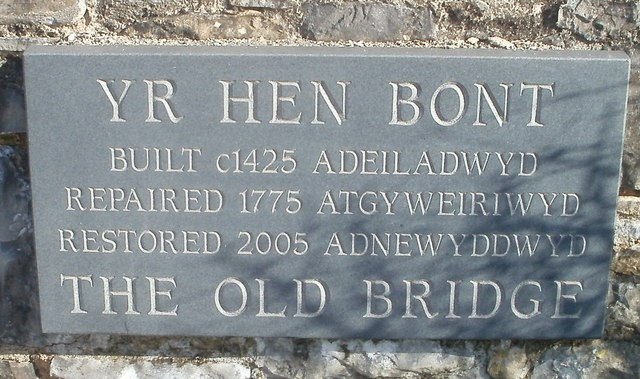
The Old Bridge stone plaque

The bridge was last used by motor vehicles in 1920. In 2005 the bridge was restored and again in 2011 with its cobbled footway relaid using traditional lime mortar. The bridge now has statutory protection as a scheduled ancient monument (GM049) and grade II* listed structure. It is still used as a footbridge with the width of the bridge being 2.6 m (8.5 ft).

== See also ==
- List of bridges in Wales
- Old Bridge for other bridges with the same name.
