= Ponte Vecchio (disambiguation) =

The Ponte Vecchio (Italian: "Old Bridge") is a medieval bridge over the Arno River, in Florence, Italy.

Ponte Vecchio may also refer to:

== Bridges ==
- Ponte Vecchio, Bassano, or Ponte degli Alpini, a sixteenth-century bridge over the river Brenta in Bassano del Grappa, Italy
- Ponte Vecchio, Cesena, or Ponte Clemente, an eighteenth-century bridge over the River Savio in Cesena, Italy
- Ponte Vecchio, Ivrea, a stone and brick arch bridge over the Dora Baltea in Ivrea, Italy
- Ponte Coperto, a brick and stone arch bridge over the Ticino River in Pavia, Italy

== Other uses ==
- Ponte Vecchio, a generation of the Intel Xe GPU architecture

== See also ==
- Old Bridge (disambiguation)
