= Old Bridge Road =

Old Bridge Road is the name of multiple highways in the United States:

- Maryland State Route 707, called Old Bridge Road in West Ocean City
- Virginia State Route 622, called Old Bridge Road in Culpeper County
- Virginia State Route 641, called Old Bridge Road in Prince William County
