= Old Bridge, Huntingdon =

Bridge in Huntingdon, Cambridgeshire, England

Coordinates: 52.3274°N 0.1777°W

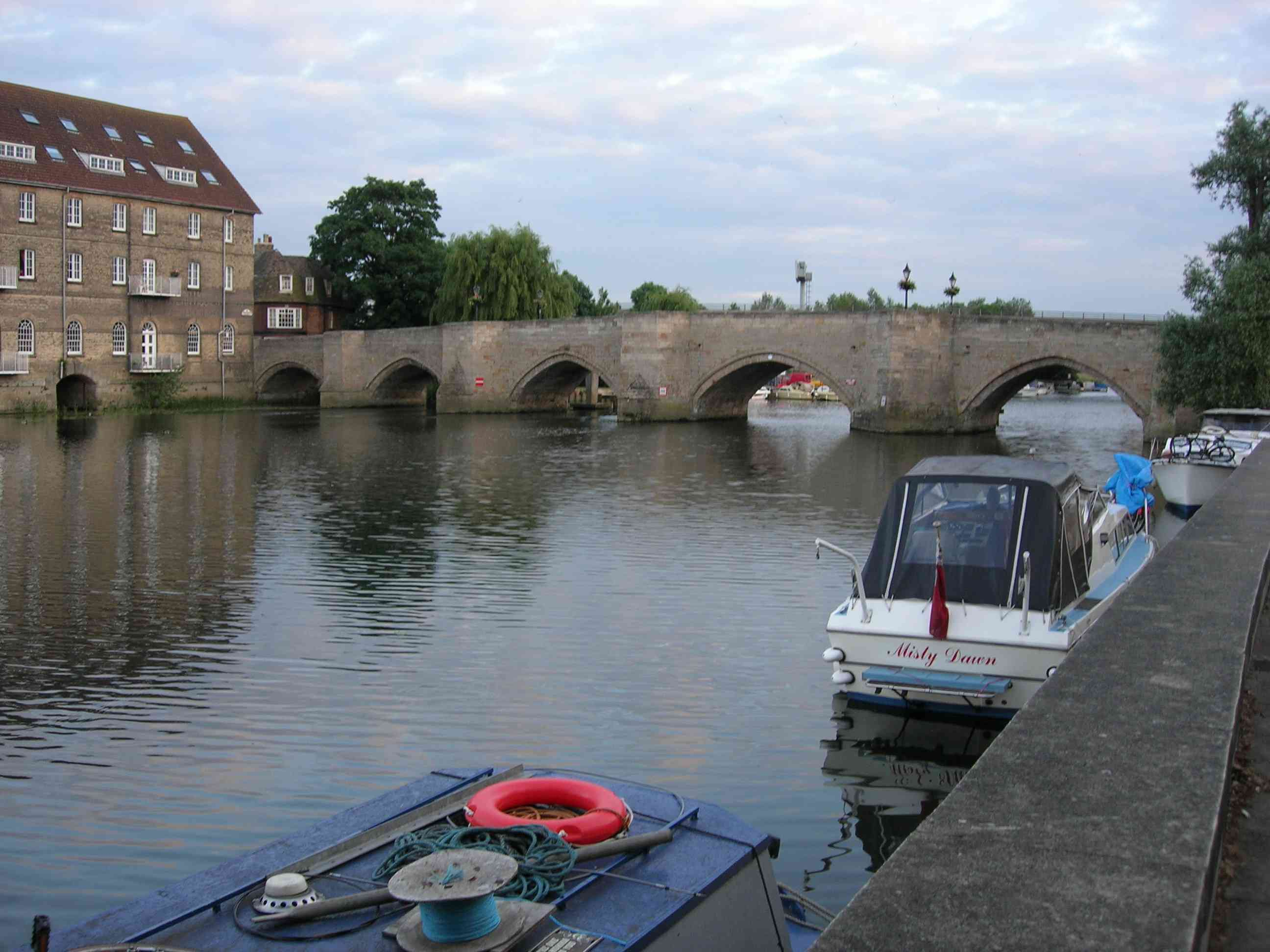
The old bridge over the Great Ouse. Both the modern steel footbridge to Godmanchester and the A14 flyover are invisible from the River Park and this angle.

The Old Bridge between Huntingdon and Godmanchester (now part of Cambridgeshire, England) is a well-preserved medieval stone bridge over the River Great Ouse.

== History ==
The town has long been an important bridgehead, with Ermine Street (connecting London to Lincoln and York), as well as various east–west trade routes, crossing the Great Ouse here. Ermine Street would have first crossed the river here via a ford, believed to be some way to the west of the present bridge. Edward the Elder built a wooden bridge in the early 10th century a few yards to the west of the current bridge, and also ordered the nearby Huntingdon Castle to be rebuilt. Until the 1107 construction of the first bridge in St Ives, it is believed that there was no bridge further downstream, and foreign trade would navigate the river as far upstream as Huntingdon.

Responsibility for the bridge's repair was for centuries a matter of dispute. In 1259 a court ruling finally ordered that the county should pay to keep it repaired in return for rendering the bridge toll-free. Nonetheless, the bridge remained poorly maintained, and by 1329 was declared to be in severe danger of collapse.

The current bridge was constructed around 1332, with work starting on both banks of the river. The slight kink near the central pier was a result of the lack of alignment of the two halves. Consisting of six arches and faced with ashlar, the parapets which form recesses for pedestrians, are triangular on the north side, and semi-hexagonal on the south.

It was intended for both pedestrian and horse-drawn transport (the bridge has recesses for people to stand to let the heavier traffic pass), but now serves exclusively for light vehicular traffic. Pedestrians use a parallel footbridge just metres upstream. Local heavy vehicles must use the A1307 with other traffic using the A14 viaduct via Brampton Hut interchange, or the A141.

The bridge was Grade I listed as Huntingdon Bridge by Historic England Ref 1128636 in 1950 and is a Scheduled Ancient Monument The Nuns Bridge is a different Grade II Listed, originally a late medieval bridge 1.3 km West.
