= St Ives Bridge =

Bridge in Cambridgeshire, England

Coordinates: 52.322826°N 0.075338°W

St Ives Bridge is a 15th-century stone arch bridge crossing the River Great Ouse on the south side of St Ives, Cambridgeshire, England. It carried the ancient main road to London over the river. It is notable for incorporating a chapel into the structure. It is a Grade I Listed Structure.

== History ==
=== Before the stone bridge ===
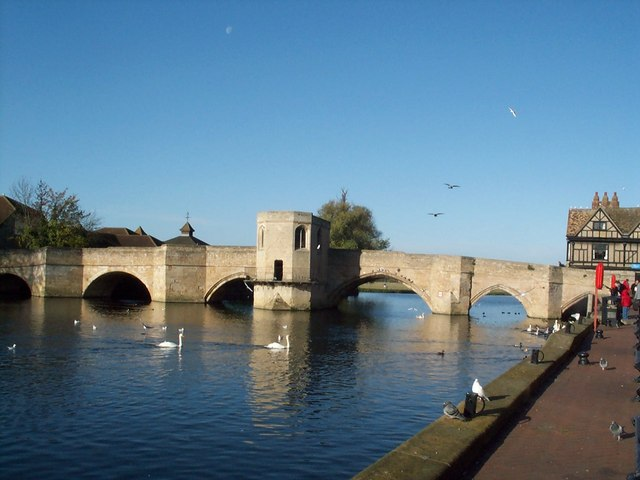
St Ives Bridge showing the six spans and the chapel; the southern (newer) spans are on the left

St Ives has long been an important religious and agricultural centre. As the town is located on the north side of the River Great Ouse, it was necessary for London-bound travel to cross the river. At first this was achieved by means of a ford, probably dating back well over a thousand years. The river was at that time much wider and much shallower.

The settlement that became St Ives, at first known as Slepe, was developed by the Abbot of Ramsey Abbey, probably Ednoth, who had founded the Priory of St Ivo there about AD 1000. In the year 1110 they obtained a Royal Charter from King Henry I authorising them to hold an annual fair in the town. They built the town's first bridge, a wooden structure, in 1107.

However the terrain on the south side was a marshy flood plain, according to Flanagan a causeway was made to traverse it:

It can be deduced that, at St Ives, the causeway comprised small bridges over the natural watercourses within the meadow, and for the rest of its length in between the bridges, there was a raised earth embankment which may have had a covering of stones or brushwood.

=== The stone bridge ===
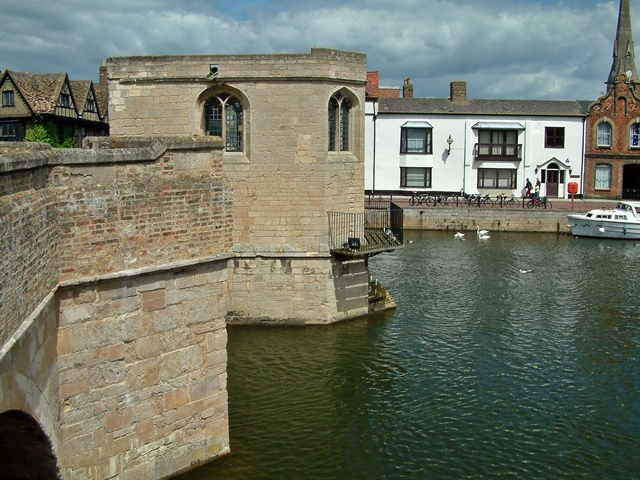
The view from the bridge, looking north towards the town; the chapel is in the foreground

The wooden bridge required considerable maintenance, and in 1414 it was decided to replace it with a stone arch bridge; the work was carried out between 1415 and 1426. It was built with six arches of limestone from Barnack, quarried about 30 miles away on the River Welland near Peterborough. In the year of completion, a chapel on one pier of the bridge was added; it was dedicated to St Leger, sometimes spelt Ledger, or Leodegarius. The purpose of this and other bridge chapels was to allow travellers to pray or to give thanks for a safe journey.

In 1539 King Henry VIII set about the dissolution of the monasteries, and Ramsey Abbey was included. The ownership of the bridge and the chapel were separated: the bridges was passed to the Manor of St Ives, forming a lucrative asset because of the right to levy tolls. The chapel became a private house. The manor, and therefore the bridge, was crown property until 1628 when King Charles I sold it to the Earl of Manchester.

=== Civil war partial destruction, decay, and rebuilding ===
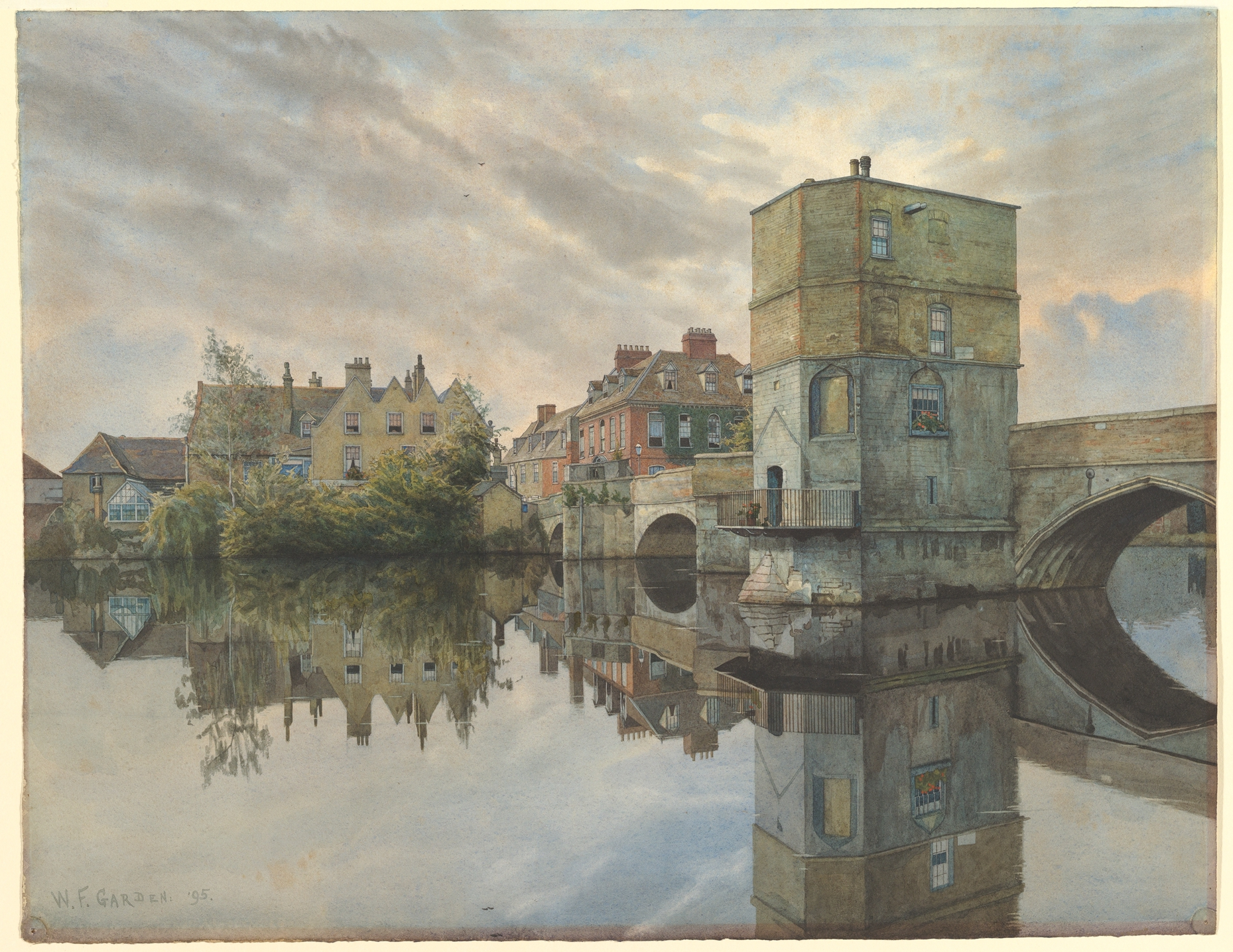
St Ives Bridge painted by William Fraser Garden in 1895 when the additional storeys were on the chapel building

During the English Civil War, Cavalier forces loyal to the king were massing in Bedfordshire, and the roundhead forces, following Oliver Cromwell, needed to defend Cambridge. The roundheads partially demolished the bridges over the River Great Ouse at St Ives, St Neots and Huntingdon, replacing the demolished spans with drawbridges. At St Ives the two arches on the southern side were demolished, and a drawbridge was installed in 1645.

The drawbridge remained in use until 1716, when the demolished spans were reinstated by the Duke of Manchester, who had inherited the ownership of the bridge. When the bridge was partially rebuilt that year, the shape of the new arches was different from the original ones, so that the bridge has two rounded arches on its south side, and two Gothic arches on the north. The northern arches date from 1426. Brick parapets were provided as part of this work; it is possible that there were no parapets previously.

The gothic spans are of 13 feet to 30 feet span, and they have five ribs, missing in some places, supporting the arch rings which are covered by weather drip moulds. The two southern arches are segmental, with spans of 16 and 21 feet. The bridge has not been widened, and provides a roadway of 12 feet 6 inches between the parapets.

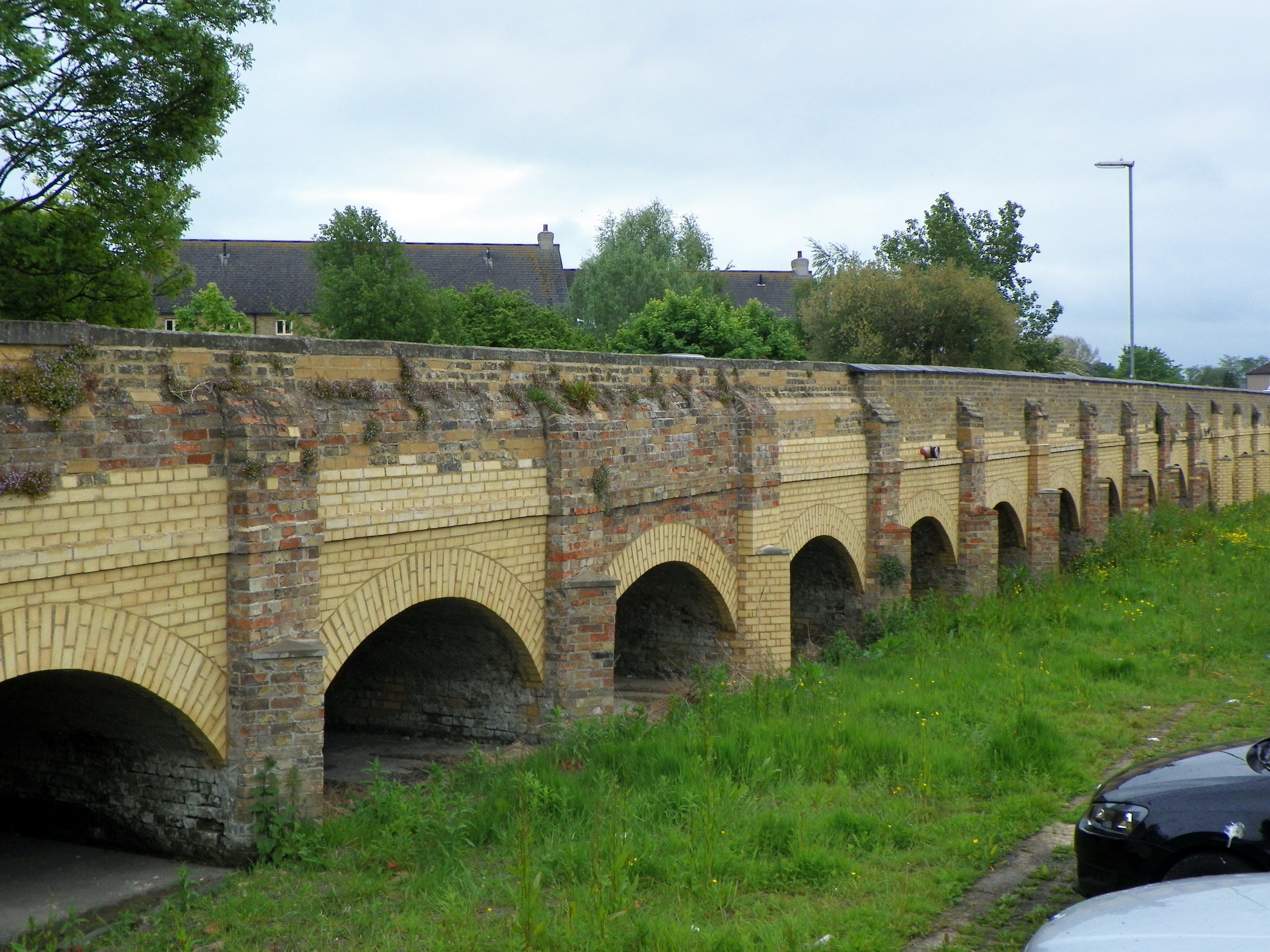
The New Bridges at St Ives

The southern approach to the bridge still traversed marshy land on a causeway. In 1810 it was reported that the causeway comprised two single-arch wooden bridges, a larger wooden bridge called Great Helford Bridge and a brick tunnel, (possibly a culvert). It was "so worn, foul, miry, deep ruinous, broken, washed away, lowered, overflowed and drowned in such decay for want of due reparation and amendment". The bridge and causeway were now, since the 18th century, on an important turnpike, a major north-south route from Bury (near Ramsey) to Stratton (near Biggleswade). The Turnpike trust was established by an act of Parliament, and as such its upkeep carried legal maintenance obligations.

An act of Parliament was obtained in 1819 authorising the raising of capital to carry out repairs, and in 1822 the Duke of Manchester built a viaduct, 200 yards in length consisting of 55 low arches. This was completed and opened on 17 September 1822, and became known as The New Bridges; they are a grade II* listed structure.

=== The chapel ===
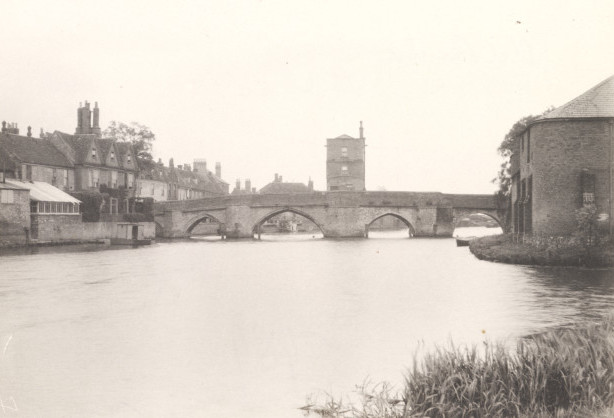
The bridge in 1902, before the extra stories were removed.

The bridge chapel was deconsecrated in 1539 during the dissolution of the monasteries. After that time it was used as a private dwelling, and in the nineteenth century for a period as a public house. In 1736 two additional storeys were constructed, in brick.

By 1930 the chapel structure was found to be weakened, so the extra stories were removed and the chapel restored. As a result, the roof is modern. An unusual feature is the crypt, about two metres above the river's water level. The bridge and the chapel are now Grade I listed and a scheduled monument. The chapel is still used for public worship on an occasional basis.

=== Abolition of tolls and restoration work ===
The bridge owners had levied tolls, and in the early twentieth century hostility to the tolls became a serious issue. In 1921 Huntingdonshire County Council adopted the bridge and the New Bridges and abolished the toll. In the spring of 1928 the chapel was purchased by two local council members, at a time when it appeared that the chapel would fall into ruins. They gifted it to Huntingdonshire County Council, reuniting the bridge and chapel in one ownership again.

An appeal was started for money to restore the chapel; the increase of motorised road traffic – the bridge still carried the main London Road – had accelerated the deterioration. The money was quickly found and in 1930 the top two storeys of the chapel were removed. Repair work was necessary on the remaining part of the chapel, and that was complete by April 1930.

The bridge continued to serve as the primary southern access to the town, carrying the B1040 road; it was the only local road bridge across the river between Huntingdon and Earith, and buses and heavy lorry traffic used the bridge until Harrison Way by-pass was added in 1980, curving round to the east of the built-up area.

== Preservation ==
The bridge is one of nine scheduled monuments Grade I in Cambridgeshire: Cambridgeshire County Council is the relevant county authority now. All maintenance must be carried out in a sympathetic manner to preserve its aesthetic and functional aspects. Since 1980 the foundations have been strengthened and the structure reinforced. In 1998 the bridge was resurfaced, special precautions being taken to prevent water ingress into the structure. In 2002, external lighting of the arches and chapel was fitted, along with internal lighting of the chapel, and lights fitted into the pedestrian refuges at each pier. Historic England control all work on the bridge.

== Parapet breaches ==
With heavy vehicles crossing the narrow bridges, there have been a number of occasions when the parapet has been breached. In 1941 a Home Guard vehicle did so, followed in 1947 when an amphibious tank breached the parapet. In 1976 a gravel lorry swerved to avoid a pedestrian emerging from the chapel and hit the parapet.

== See also ==
- Old Bridge, Huntingdon, 6 miles up-stream.
- Chantry Chapel of St Mary the Virgin, Wakefield
- Rotherham Bridge
- St Mary's Bridge Chapel (Derby)
