= Chantry Bridge =

Medieval bridge in Wakefield, England

Coordinates: 53°40′36″N 1°29′23″W

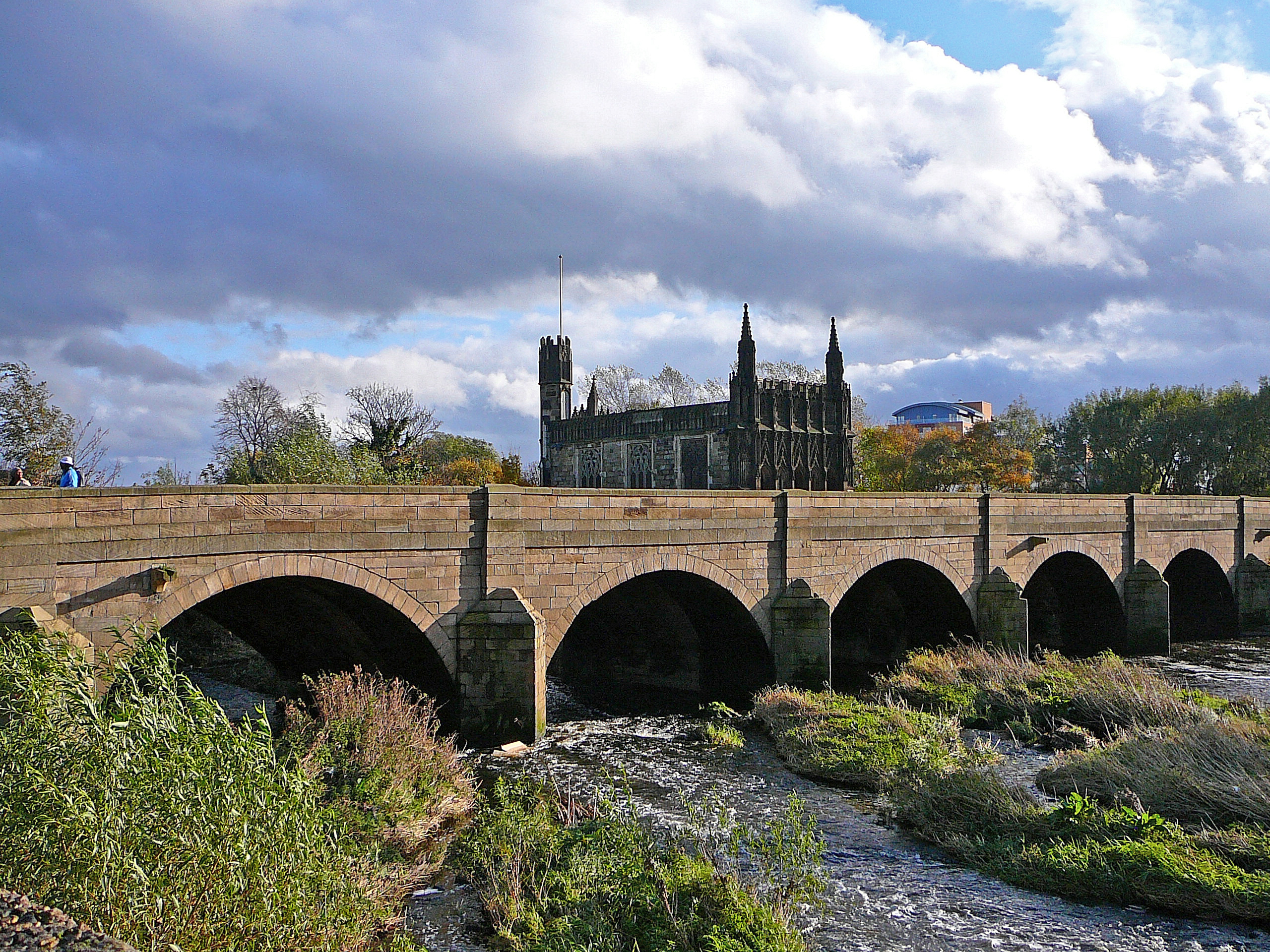
The bridge in 2008, with the Chantry Chapel

Chantry Bridge, sometimes known as Wakefield Bridge, is a mediaeval bridge in the city of Wakefield, in West Yorkshire, in England.

In the early 14th century, there was a timber bridge over the River Calder in Wakefield, with Kirkgate connecting the bridge to the town centre. The bridge was damaged by flooding in the 1330s, and a decision was taken to rebuild it in stone.

Construction of the new bridge began in 1342, with spans connecting the north bank to a small island. The Chantry Chapel of St Mary the Virgin was built on the island. The bridge was then completed from the island to the south bank, in similar style, but only the arches supporting the northern part of the bridge have ribs. The chapel was consecrated in 1356, and this is sometimes taken to be the completion date of the bridge.

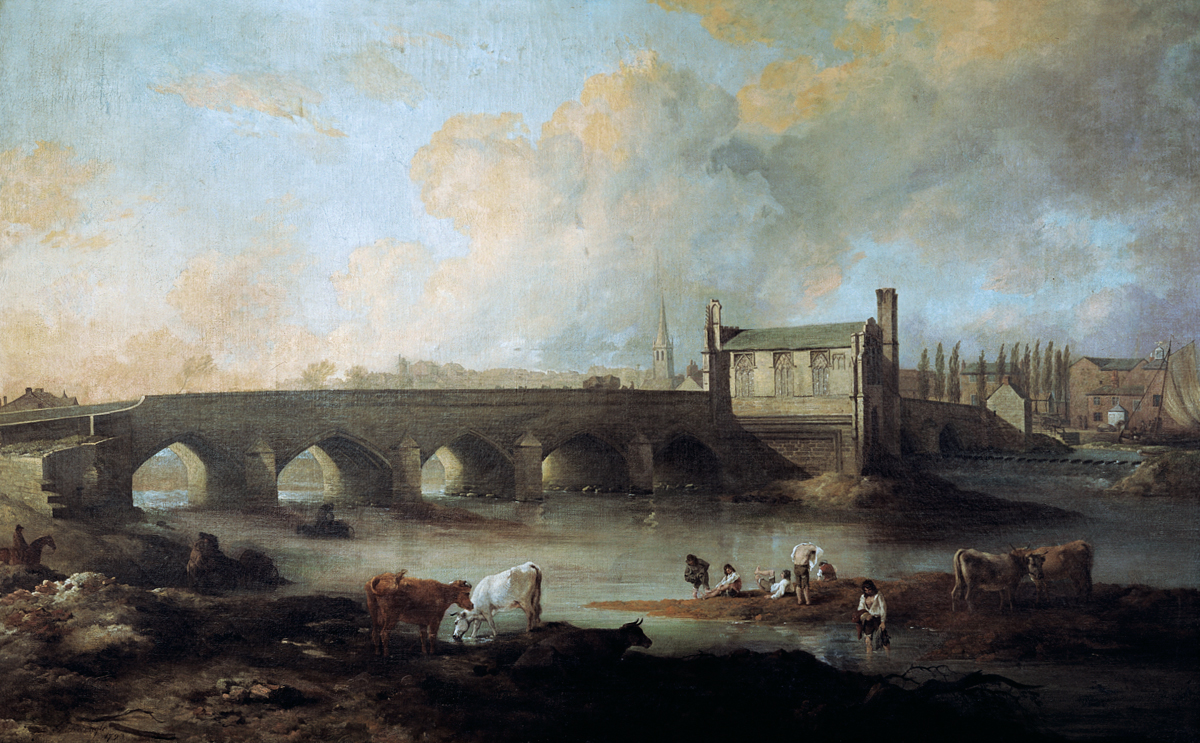
The bridge in 1793, painted by Philip Reinagle

The bridge was widened by nine feet in 1758. It was painted by J. M. W. Turner in 1797, in which year it was widened by nine feet for a second time. This work was probably designed by John Carr of York and undertaken by Bernard Hartley. Wakefield New Bridge was constructed immediately upstream of Chantry Bridge in 1933, and now carries the large majority of traffic. Chantry Bridge was Grade I listed in 1953.

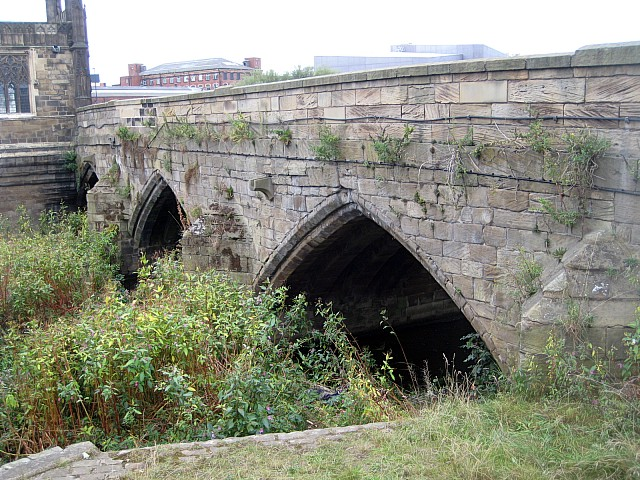
Pointed arches on the downstream side of the bridge

The bridge has nine arches. The original arches are visible on the downstream side, and are pointed, while the widened section on the upstream side has round arches. Each arch is supported by a platform with a cutwater. There is a plain parapet.

== See also ==
- Grade I listed buildings in West Yorkshire
- Listed buildings in Wakefield
