= Rotherham Bridge =

Grade I listed bridge in England

Rotherham Bridge Chantry Bridge
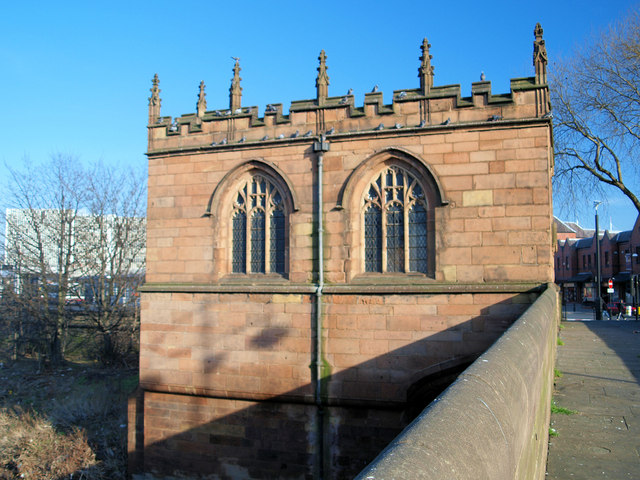
- The bridge chapel, seen from the west
- Coordinates: 53.4325°N 1.3587°W
- OS grid reference: SK42629307
- Carries: Pedestrians (formerly vehicular traffic)
- Crosses: River Don
- Locale: Rotherham, South Yorkshire, England

Characteristics
- Design: Masonry arch bridge
- Material: Sandstone ashlar
- No. of spans: 4

History
- Opened: c. 1483

Statistics

Listed Building – Grade I
- Designated: 19 October 1951
- Reference no.: 1191884

Location
- Interactive map of Rotherham Bridge

Rotherham Bridge (also known as Chantry Bridge) is a late 15th-century stone arch bridge spanning the River Don in Rotherham, South Yorkshire, England. Notable for incorporates the Chapel of Our Lady of the Bridge, it is one of only four surviving medieval bridges in England that feature an intact bridge chapel.

The structure is both a Grade I listed building and a Scheduled monument, recognized for its exceptional architectural and historical significance.

== History ==
=== Construction and early history (c. 1483) ===
Prior to the stone structure, crossing of the River Don at Rotherham was served by a timber bridge. Construction of the sandstone ashlar replacement began around 1483, funded primarily through local bequests, including a significant donation from Thomas Rotherham, Archbishop of York.

The chapel, dedicated to the Virgin Mary, was built directly onto the central pier on the upstream side of the bridge. It served as a place of prayer for travellers leaving or entering the town and hosted daily masses paid for by local chantries.

=== Post-Reformation and adaptive reuse ===
Following the Dissolution of the Chantries under the Abolition of Chantries Acts of 1545 and 1547, the chapel lost its religious function and passed into secular ownership. Over the next three centuries, the chapel building was adapted for numerous civic and commercial uses. It was used as a lock-up and temporary prison, earning the local name "the Bridge Gaol". Also as an Almshouse when it was briefly adapted to shelter the town's poor during the late 17th century. And used variously as a tobacconist's shop, a dwelling, and a depot for newsagents in the 19th and early 20th centuries.

=== Preservation and 20th-century restoration ===
By the early 20th century, increasing traffic across the River Don put severe pressure on the narrow medieval structure. In 1927, Rotherham Corporation constructed the new Chantry Bridge immediately downstream to take vehicle traffic, bypassing the historic bridge.

Following public fundraising led by local antiquarians and the Sulman Trust, the bridge chapel was acquired, restored, and rededicated for divine service in 1924. Further extensive repairs to the stone arches and river piers were undertaken in the 1990s and 2000s to protect the bridge against river erosion.

== Architecture ==
The bridge consists of four primary segmental arches constructed from dressed local yellow sandstone ashlar. The central piers are fitted with pointed cutwaters on both the upstream and downstream faces to withstand high water flow from the Don catchment.

=== Chapel of Our Lady ===
The chapel sits on the central western pier. Built in the Perpendicular Gothic style, it features a rectangular plan with embattled parapets and decorative pinnacles; three-light traceried windows with hoodmoulds and a rib-vaulted crypt incorporated directly into the structure of the bridge pier.

== Comparative context ==
Rotherham Bridge is one of only four surviving medieval bridges in England that retain their original chapels. The other three are:

1. Wakefield Bridge (Chapel of St Mary), West Yorkshire
2. St Ives Bridge, Cambridgeshire
3. Elvet Bridge (Chapel of St James), Durham

== See also ==
- Grade I listed buildings in South Yorkshire
- Listed buildings in Rotherham (Boston Castle Ward)
