= Old Town Hall, Wakefield =

Municipal building in Wakefield, West Yorkshire, England

Old Town Hall
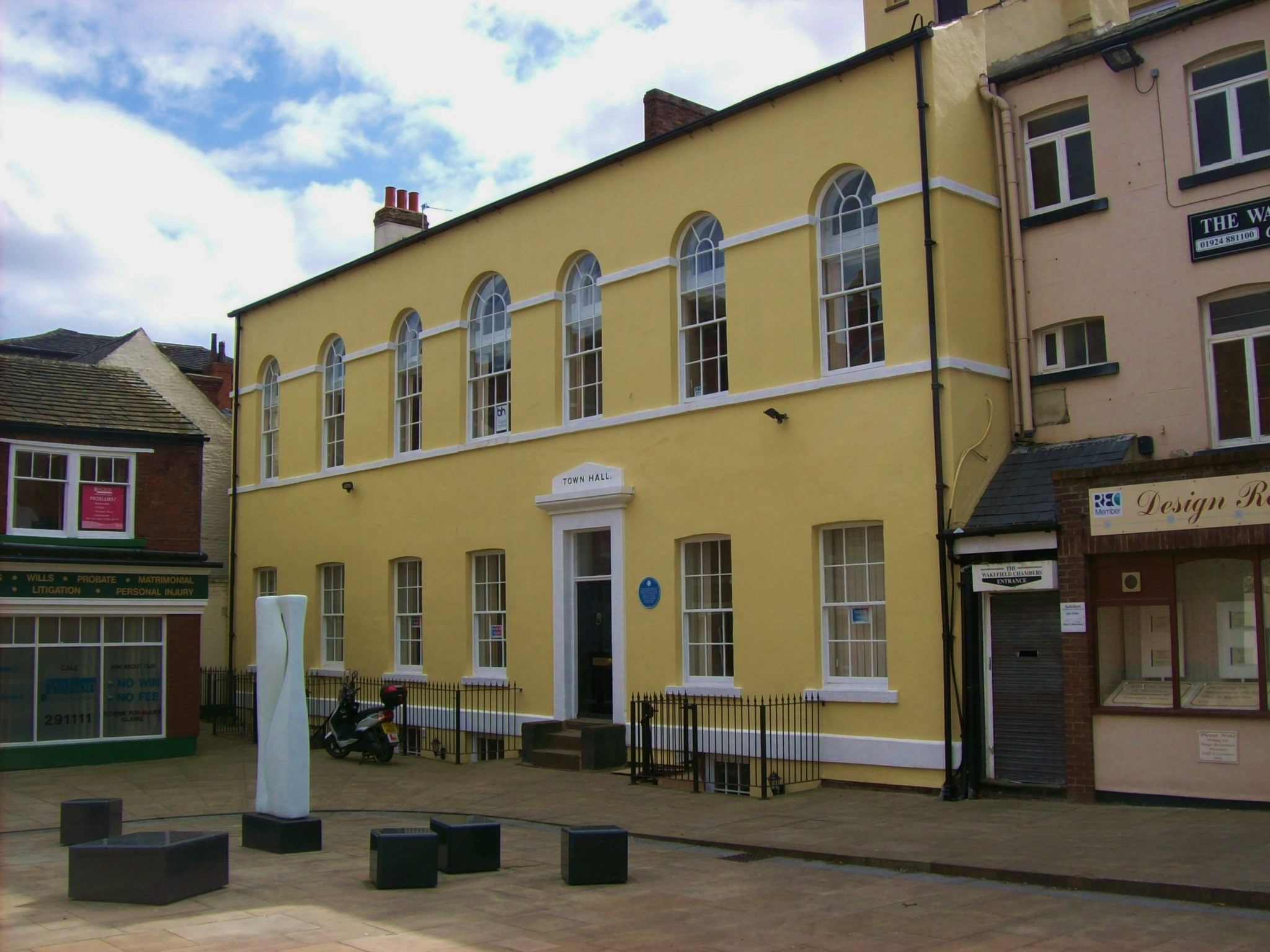
- The building, in 2013

- Location within West Yorkshire
- 53.6833°N 1.5007°W
- Location: Wakefield, West Yorkshire

History
- Built: 1800

Site notes
- Architectural style: Neoclassical style

Listed Building – Grade II
- Designated: 30 March 1971
- Reference no.: 1259842

Wakefield Old Town Hall, also known as No. 5 Crown Court, is a historic building in the city centre of Wakefield, in West Yorkshire, in England. After operating as a town hall from 1861 to 1880, it served as an organ factory and then as commercial offices, before being adapted for residential use.

== History ==
The building lies on Crown Court. It was designed in the neoclassical style and constructed between 1798 and 1800 as the New Assembly Rooms, replacing rooms in the White Hart Inn on Kirkgate. In 1803, the Wakefield Star, the town's first newspaper, was founded in and published from the building. The Assembly Rooms closed in about 1821, and from 1845 the building served as the headquarters of the Wakefield Church Institution. This moved into purpose-built premises in 1858, and from 1861, the building housed the council chambers. The council moved into a new Wakefield Town Hall in 1880.

The old town hall then became an organ building factory, operated by Alfred Kirkland, in 1893. Kirkland continued designing and manufacturing organs there, until the end of the First World War when he relocated to Holloway Road in London. The building was then adapted for commercial use as offices. A variety of commercial tenants were subsequently accommodated including, since the early 21st century, a recruitment business operating in the accounting sector. A piece of public art, sculpted by Oliver Barratt, cast in bronze and known as "seams", was unveiled outside the building in July 2007. Since 2018, the building has largely been in residential use.

== Architecture ==
The building is two storeys high, with a basement. It is seven bays wide, and is built of brick, faced with stucco. All the windows are sashes, and those on the first floor have round heads. There is a four-panel front door, up three steps, with a fanlight, above which is inscribed "TOWN HALL". There are wrought iron railings in front of the building. The building was grade II listed in 1971.

== See also ==
- Listed buildings in Wakefield
