= St John the Baptist's Church, Wakefield, West Yorkshire =

Anglican church in Wakefield, West Yorkshire, England

St John the Baptist
- Church of Saint John the Baptist
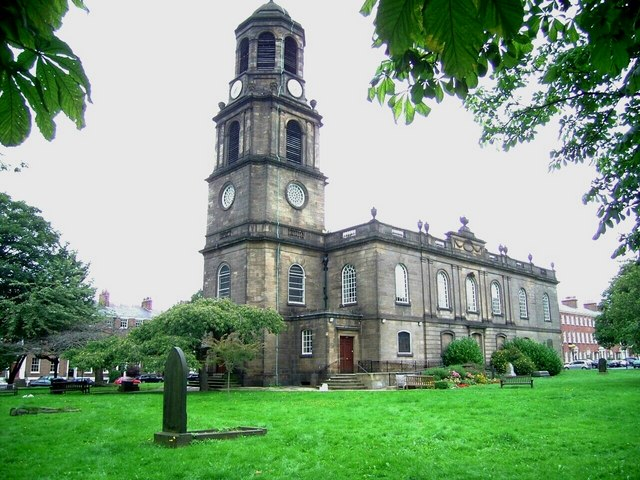
- St John the Baptist
- 53.6884°N 1.5055°W
- OS grid reference: SE 32753 21438
- Location: St John's Square, Wakefield, West Yorkshire
- Country: England
- Denomination: Anglican
- Website: Official webpage

History
- Status: Parish church

Architecture
- Groundbreaking: 1791
- Completed: 1795

Administration
- Province: York
- Diocese: Leeds

Clergy
- Bishop(s): Rt. Rev. Tony Robinson, Bishop of Wakefield
- Abbot: Pam Mercer Peter Lavine Barbara Sessford
- Vicar: Stephanie Buchanan

The Church of Saint John the Baptist in Wakefield, West Yorkshire, England is an active Anglican parish church in the archdeaconry of Wakefield and the Diocese of Wakefield. The church is Grade II* listed and has been since 29 March 1971. St John's is the smaller of the Anglican churches in Wakefield City Centre, the larger being Wakefield Cathedral.

== History ==
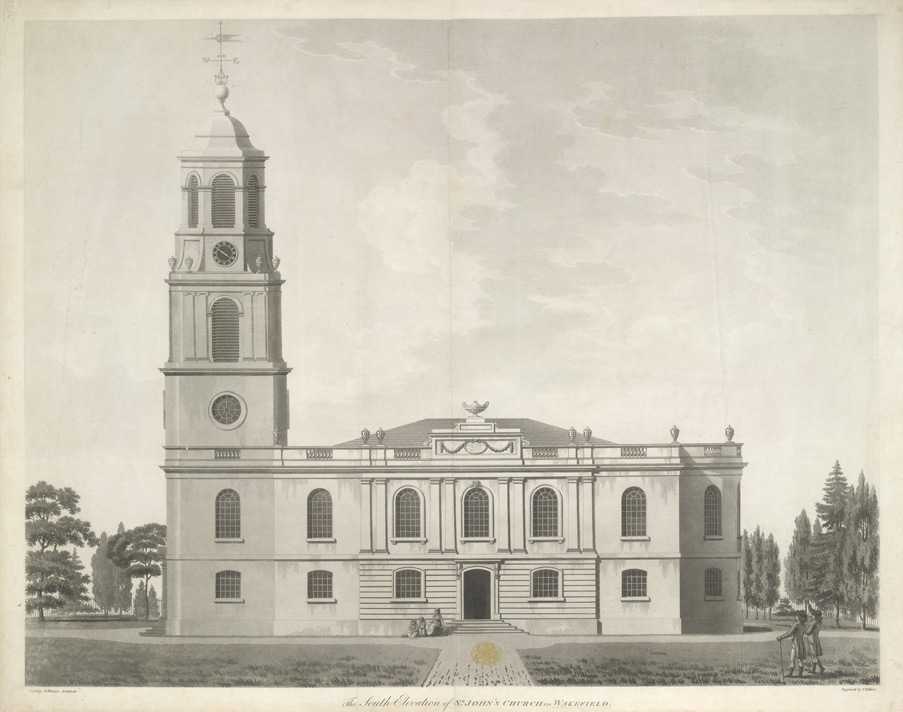
Rendering of 1797 by Lindley & Watson architects

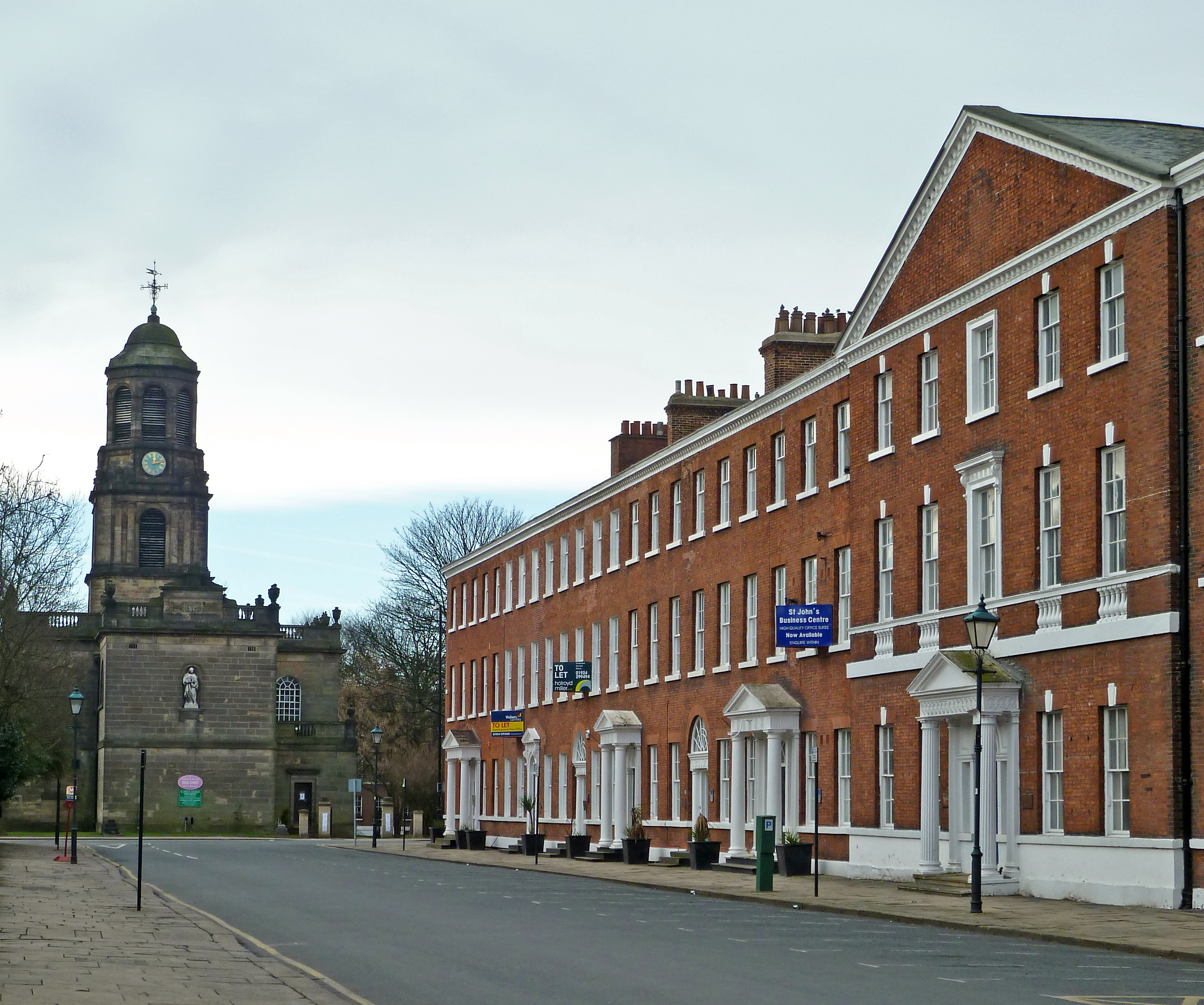
The church with the corresponding Georgian architecture in the north end of Wakefield

The church was constructed between 1791 and 1795 to a design by Charles Watson of Doncaster and York. It was altered in 1885 and then extended in 1905 to designs by John Thomas Micklethwaite. The church was not built in isolation but as the centrepiece of a new development to the North of Wakefield City Centre and matches much of the other Georgian architecture in the vicinity and is the sole large development in Wakefield of this era. The tower was rebuilt in 1885 also to a design by Micklethwaite and other internal alterations were made at this time.

== Grounds ==
The church is situated in St John's Square in open grounds. The grounds are tree-lined and overlooked by the Georgian terraces built at the same time. There is no formal cemetery but a small number of graves and memorials are in the grounds. The nave backs closely onto Wentworth Street. To the north-east corner there is a war memorial in the grounds to the workers at Wrenthorpe Colliery who lost their lives in the First World War.

== Listing and architectural notability ==
The church was grade II* listed on 29 March 1971 for its architectural notability.

The church of St John the Baptist, St John's Square, Wakefield, is designated at Grade II* for the following principal reasons:

- The church is an elegant and imposing classical design which, despite being the work of more than one period, maintains a unity of style and retains its Georgian character and detail.
- Its plan, with west porches and a wide tall nave accommodating a gallery, is typical of the Georgian period.
- The church is the centrepiece of the well-preserved Georgian town planning scheme encompassing St John's Square and St John's North, forming a notable episode in Wakefield's urban development.
- It is a prominent work by leading Georgian Yorkshire architects.

— Text from the original listing

== Architectural style ==
The building is of Ashlar sandstone with a hipped slate roof on the nave and aisles and a lead one to the chancel, chapel and vestry. The church is of a classical style.

=== Tower ===
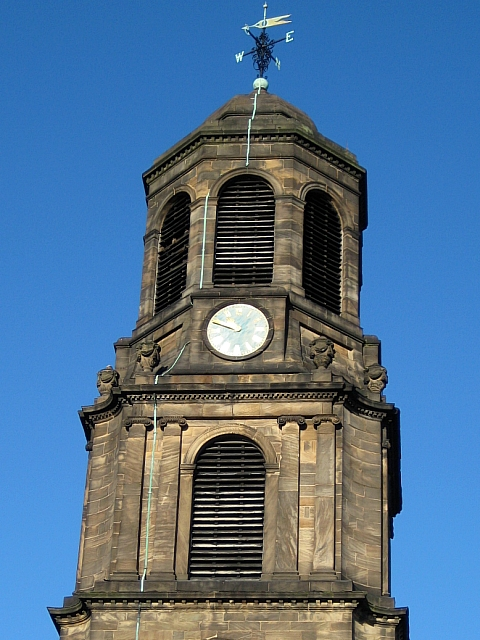
Detail of upper stages of the tower

The tower is not the original one but was a replacement built in 1885 to a design by London architect, J. T. Micklethwaite. The tower is a west tower with five stages, a chancel with south chapel and over the north vestry an organ loft. There is a west doorway in the tower with Tuscan pilasters. The uppermost stage is octagonal with round belfry openings and a clock face. It is topped with a polygonal dome with a weathervane to its apex. Inside there is a round stairwell with two cantilevered stone staircases.

=== Nave ===
The nave has five bays. There are round-headed windows in the upper-tier and segmental headed windows in the lower tier. The south side has a central field with an oval panel, festoons and is surmounted by an urb. The back end of the main nave has porches with plain parapets and north and south doors. The nave has a platerred ceiling with three sunken round panels. The walls are plastered and there is a flagstone floor.

=== Chancel ===
There is a two bay chancel. The chancel has high-set Discletian north and south windows. There is a statue of John the Baptist in a round-headed niche and a parapet showing the IHS monogram. There are Tuscan polasters and a painted and gilded barrelled ceiling. The chancel porch was added in 1905. There is a black and white marble floor.

=== Chapel and vestry ===
There is a small single-bay chapel with an organ loft set above and a blind east window. the chapel is connected to the chancel by colonnaded entrances. There is a small vestry with a segmental headed window and door.

== Fixtures ==
There are still several of the original pews. Most other furnishings are late 19th century in origin and we installed during the restoration of this time. There is a polygonal pulpit with fielded panels which is dated 1822 though the fixture itself is likely later. The chancel has a fielded-panel dado which is dated 1912. There are choir stalls dated 1900s with ornate foliage crestings to the ends. There is a rederos depicting the crucifixion framed by Corinthian columns. Communion rails were added in 1905. There is a second rederos in the north chapel. There are wall tablets dating from the 18th and 19th centuries and 20th century square panels depicting the Stations of the Cross.

== Stained glass windows ==
There are several stained glass windows. The chancel windows date from 1905. The chapel window was of manufacture by E. Pickett & Co of Leeds. The South window is a design of H. Hughes and dates from 1868.

== See also ==
- Grade II* listed buildings in West Yorkshire
- Listed buildings in Wakefield
