= Wakefield Town Hall =

Municipal building in Wakefield, West Yorkshire, England

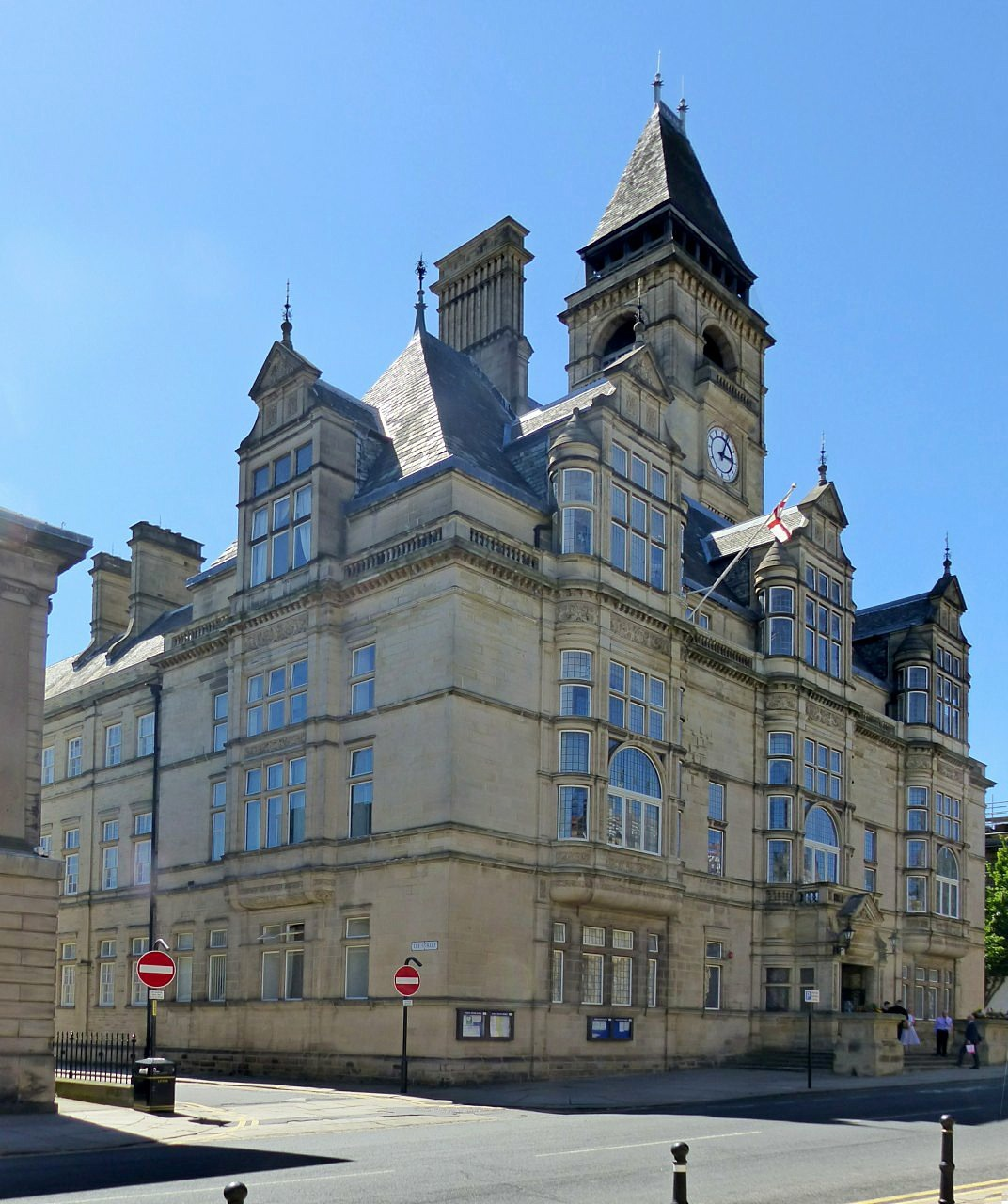
- Wakefield Town Hall

- Location within West Yorkshire
- 53.6838°N 1.5014°W
- Location: Wakefield, West Yorkshire

History
- Built: 1880

Site notes
- Architect: Thomas Edward Collcutt
- Architectural style: Gothic style

Listed Building – Grade I
- Designated: 30 March 1971
- Reference no.: 1258995

Wakefield Town Hall is a municipal building in Wood Street in Wakefield, West Yorkshire, England. It remains a venue for weddings and civil partnerships but is no longer the headquarters of Wakefield Council which is now based at County Hall. The town hall is a Grade I listed building.

== History ==
The building was commissioned to replace the Old Town Hall in Crown Court which had been completed in 1800. After deciding that the old town hall was of insufficient status to compete with Leeds Town Hall and Bradford City Hall, civic leaders chose to procure a new town hall: the site they selected was a vacant area between the mechanics institute and the old Crown Court.

The foundation stone for the new building was laid by the mayor, Alderman William Henry Gill, in October 1877. It was designed by Thomas Edward Collcutt in the Gothic style, built by William Holdsworth of Bradford and was officially opened by the new mayor, Alderman William Hartley Lee, in October 1880. The design involved a symmetrical main frontage with three bays facing onto Wood Street; the central section, which slightly projected forward, featured a doorway with an entablature and pediment and a balcony above; there were ornate oriel windows on the first floor and pedimented bay windows on the second floor and a steeply pitched roof above. A 59 metres (194 ft) high, six-stage clock tower was erected at the north corner of the building, housing an hour-striking clock by William Potts & Sons. The hour bell, weighing 50cwt, was manufactured by Taylor of Loughborough (they also provided two quarter bells, but these were scrapped in 1948 having never been connected to the clock). Internally, the principal rooms were the council chamber, the mayor's parlour and the courtroom.

The construction also involved the creation of a tunnel which linked the courtroom and the police cells in the basement of the town hall to the police station in Tammy Hall Street.

Following the Second World War, a plaque was installed in the council chamber in June 1946 to commemorate the council's decision to award the King's Own Yorkshire Light Infantry the right to parade through the streets of the city with "drums beating, bands playing, colours flying and bayonets fixed". Princess Elizabeth, accompanied by the Duke of Edinburgh, visited the town hall and waved to the crowds from the balcony on 27 July 1949.

The building was the headquarters of the County Borough of Wakefield until 1974 when it became the local seat of government for the enlarged Wakefield Metropolitan District. However, in December 1987, Wakefield Council decided to acquire and refurbish County Hall, which was empty and deteriorating, and make County Hall its headquarters. Following an extensive refurbishment of various parts of the town hall in 2016, the council chamber was re-opened as the "Kingswood Suite", for use by the local Register Office as a venue for weddings and civil partnerships. The old courtroom was also made available for use as a reception room.

== See also ==
- Grade I listed buildings in West Yorkshire
- Listed buildings in Wakefield
