= Lingwell Gate coin moulds =

Coordinates: 53.7278°N 1.5213°W

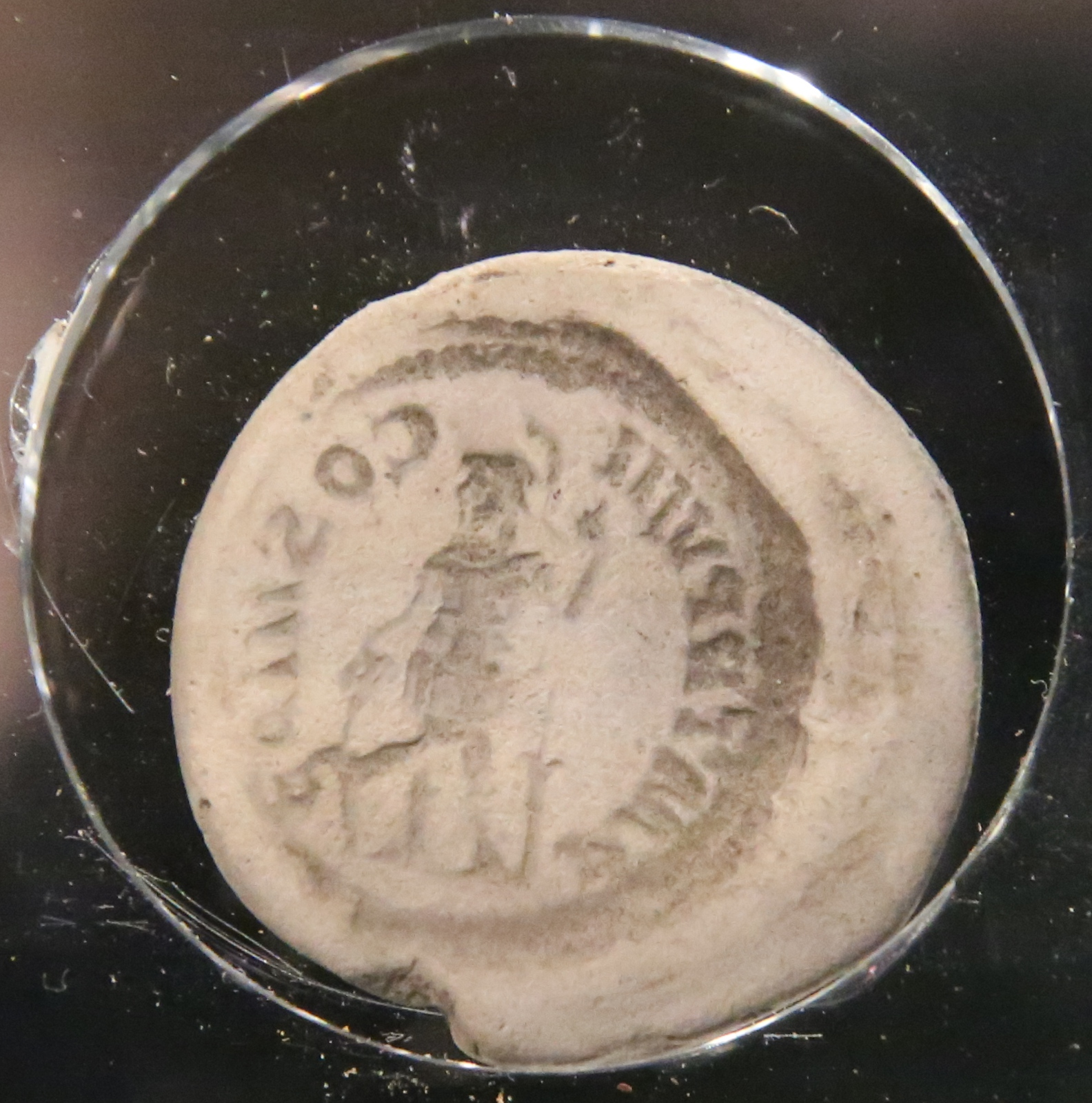
- A Lingwell Gate coin mould in Norwich Castle Museum
- Material: Clay
- Created: AD
- Discovered: 1697–1879, Lingwell Gate,
- Present location: British Museum; Wakefield Museum; Yorkshire Museum; Society of Antiquaries of London; Leeds Museums and Galleries; Hull and East Riding Museum; Norwich Castle Museum; Museum of Liverpool

The Lingwell Gate coin moulds are a group of Roman, clay coin moulds used in the forgery of coinage found at Lingwell Gate between 1697 and 1879. As of April 2021, there were 288 confirmed moulds in UK museums.

== Discovery ==
The coin moulds were first reported in a letter by Ralph Thoresby to Thomas Gale printed a November issue of the Philosophical Transactions of the Royal Society':

...Impressions upon clay, which the Reverend Mr Clark (The Lady Campden's Lecturer at Wakefield) brought me, that he happily rescued from some Labourers, who in delving in Fields near Thorp, on the Hill, found a considerable Number of them. At first we could not imagine for what use they were designed, but upon a stricter view, it appears plainly, they were for Coining, or rather Counterfeiting of the Roman Moneys.

The clay moulds and associated production materials were found on at least 13 occasions between 1697 and 1879. The exact number of moulds is unknown, but one 19th century article reported that a "wheelbarrow-full" along with crucibles and lids was found at the site on 13 March 1821. As the finds have been discovered over a long period, at least 33 individuals have owned, traded, or had close dealings with the moulds.

=== The site ===
Lingwell Gate is a site near Wakefield. The find spot is marked on the 1854 Ordnance Survey map of Yorkshire along Lingwell Gate Lane and north of the Great North Railway line.

== Description ==
The moulds are all made from clay and formed into small, annular discs. The moulds were formed by pressing a coin (a denarius) into damp clay on both sides of the mould to create a stack. An opening at one side of each matching pair of moulds allowed the molten metal to be poured in.

== Identification and acquisition ==
All of the Lingwell Gate moulds contain impressions of denarii. The moulds include impressions of coinage, spanning over 150 years, of Emperors Trajan to Maximinus II. The most frequently occurring ruler on the moulds is Septimius Severus who appears on 36 impressions.

There are 288 confirmed coin moulds distributed unevenly amongst several UK museums: British Museum (72), Wakefield Museum (67), Yorkshire Museum (54), Society of Antiquaries of London (45), Leeds Museums and Galleries (36), Hull and East Riding Museum (6), Norwich Castle Museum (5), Museum of Liverpool (3). Unspecified numbers may also exist in Manchester Museum, Ashmolean Museum, and Fitzwilliam Museum.

=== British Museum ===
The British Museum collections includes 72 coin moulds. Moulds discovered in 1821 were added to the collection in 2013. It also hold fragments of crucibles from the site.

=== Yorkshire Museum ===
54 coin moulds from Lingwell Gate are in the Yorkshire Museum. They were donated in at least three batches: in 1823 by William Harcourt; in 1825 by Mrs. Davies; and in 1846 by Mr. Pett of Huddersfield. The moulds were on public display in 1881.
