= County Hall, Wakefield =

County building in Wakefield, West Yorkshire, England

County Hall
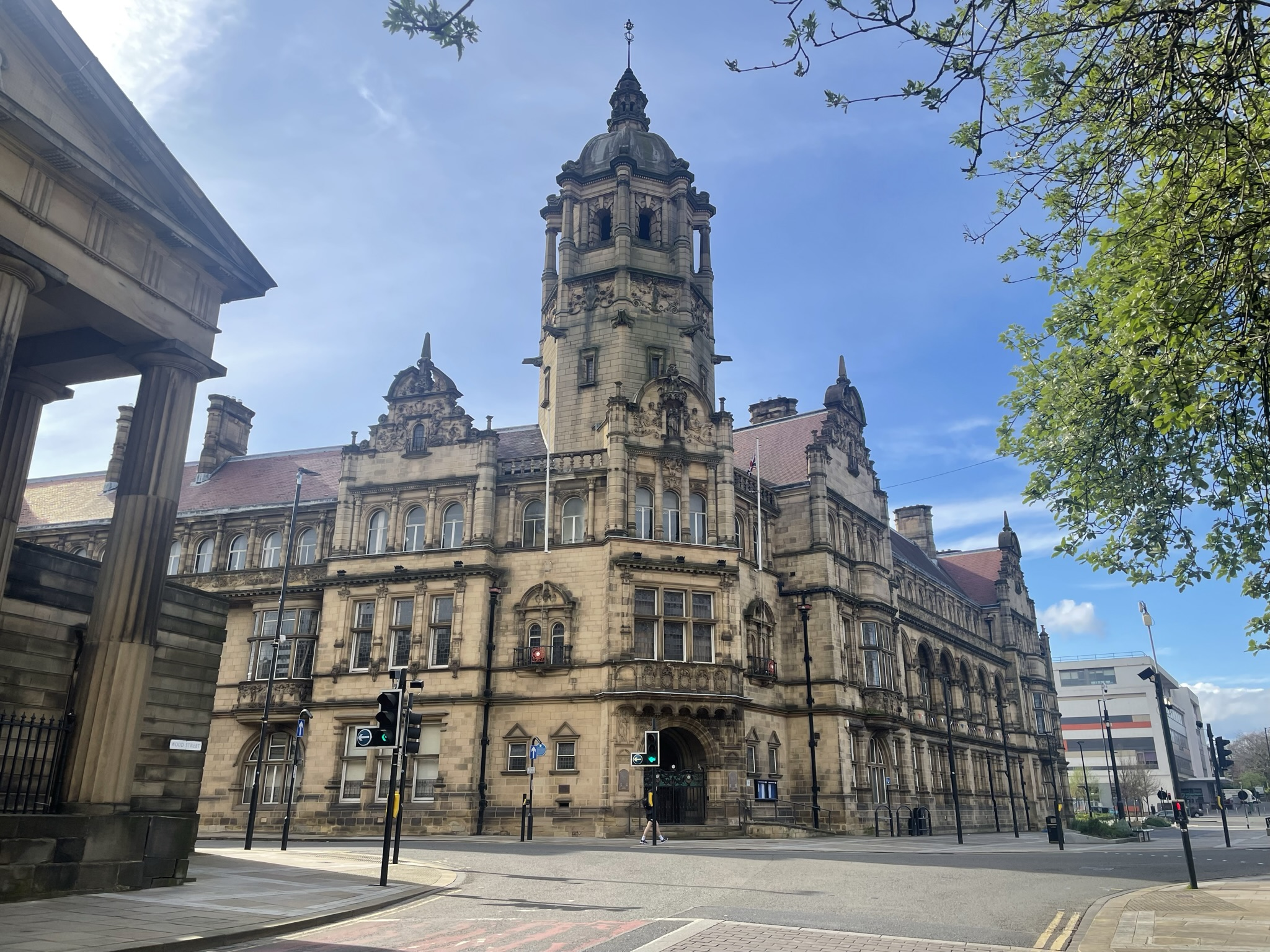

- Location within West Yorkshire
- 53.6845°N 1.5022°W
- Location: Wakefield, West Yorkshire

History
- Built: 1898

Site notes
- Architect: James S Gibson
- Architectural style: Gothic style

Listed Building – Grade I
- Designated: 30 March 1971
- Reference no.: 1242349

County Hall or West Riding County Hall stands at the corner of Bond Street and Cliff Parade in Wakefield, West Yorkshire, England. It was opened in 1898 as the headquarters of the West Riding County Council, and on the abolition of that body in 1974 became the headquarters of West Yorkshire County Council. When that council was in turn abolished in 1986 the building became the primary headquarters of Wakefield Metropolitan District Council. It is a Grade I listed building.

== History ==
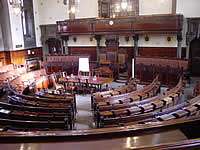
The Council Chamber, Wakefield

Site plan showing original and extended parts of County Hall

Following the implementation of the Local Government Act 1888, which established county councils in every county, there was a need to find a permanent meeting place for the West Riding of Yorkshire County Council. Its first meeting was held in February 1889 in Wakefield Town Hall, at the invitation of the borough council. For a permanent home the choice was between Leeds and Wakefield; much debate and correspondence resulted, in 1892, in the selection of Wakefield.

The site chosen for the new County Hall was that of Rishworth House on Bond Street, a gentleman's house of 1812 bought by the West Riding Quarter Sessions in 1878. The County Council had received Rishworth House at its creation and used it for committee rooms, offices and a residence for the Deputy Clerk.

In commissioning a new home, the County Council held an open architectural competition, instructing competitors to prefer "the style of architecture will be left to the competitors but the Queen Anne or Renaissance School of Architecture appears suited to an old town like Wakefield". The winning design was by James S. Gibson, who proposed a Gothic design. The Council Chamber was placed on an upper storey and in the centre of the building, so as to minimize noise from the street.

The interior decoration was largely designed by Henry Charles Fehr. On the main staircase an owl and some scales represent meditation and justice, against which recline the two winged figures of debate and dictation. The seal of the West Riding County Council hangs on each side. A second panel represents the main industries of the West Riding, surrounding the White Rose of York, all entwined by a serpent symbolising wisdom, crowned with a spray of oak for independence; beneath sprays of the honesty plant and the flax interwoven with each other represent honesty and industry. Two further panels show peace (a winged figure resting on an olive tree with ingrafted roses and sheltering a wren, doves in the tree and broken swords below) and plenty (a winged figure seated on a golden throne with arms outstretched over divers fruit and grain). Elsewhere are figures of art and science, the book of history, a winged flame representing inspiration and the lamp of knowledge; globes representing the domains of art and science appear below.

The contract for the building of the hall, with Messrs. Armitage and Hodgson of Leeds contained a fair wages clause and a ban on subcontracting to employees in sweated trades. County Hall was built in the four years from 1894 and opened by the Marquess of Ripon on 22 February 1898. New wings were added to the original building between 1912 and 1915 by George Crook of Wakefield, but in a style which matched Gibson's original design.

In 1913 a delegation from a joint committee of Middlesex County Council and the Middlesex Quarter Sessions visited Wakefield and commissioned a copy of the Council Chamber for their proposed Middlesex Guildhall. Princess Elizabeth, accompanied by the Duke of Edinburgh, visited county hall during a visit to Wakefield on 27 July 1949.

In 1974 the new West Yorkshire Metropolitan County Council inherited the building and used it as its headquarters until it was also abolished in 1986. The City of Wakefield Metropolitan District Council acquired the building in December 1987 and implemented a major refurbishment at a cost of over £3 million. The Leader of the council, Councillor John Pearman, unveiled a plaque to mark the acquisition of the building and its refurbishment in February 1991.

== See also ==
- Grade I listed buildings in West Yorkshire
- Listed buildings in Wakefield
