= Clayton Hospital =

Hospital in West Yorkshire, England

- The Mid Yorkshire Hospitals NHS Trust
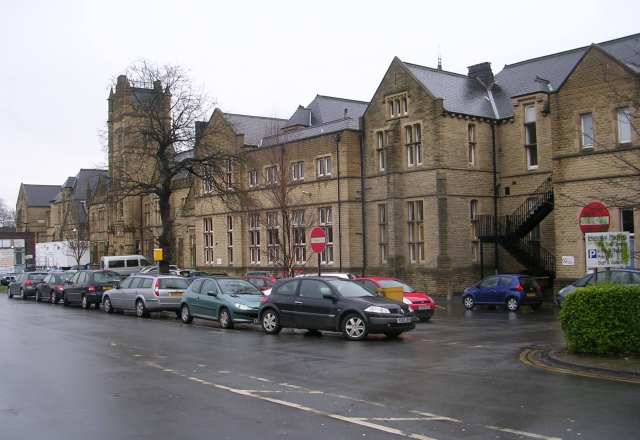
- Clayton Hospital

- Shown in West Yorkshire

Geography
- Location: Wentworth Street, Wakefield, West Yorkshire, England
- Coordinates: 53.6879°N 1.5031°W

Organisation
- Care system: NHS

Services
- Emergency department: No

History
- Founded: 1787

Links
- Lists: Hospitals in England

Clayton Hospital was a health facility in Wentworth Street, Wakefield, West Yorkshire, England. It was managed by The Mid Yorkshire Hospitals NHS Trust.

== History ==
The facility had its origins in the Wakefield General Dispensary established in Dispensary Yard in 1787. After Thomas Clayton, a former mayor, decided to finance expansion of the facility, it moved to a site at the junction of Wood Street and Cross Street in 1854. It absorbed patients from the Wakefield House of Recovery which closed at that time. It was renamed the Clayton Hospital and Wakefield General Dispensary in 1863 to reflect the completion of a new inpatients wing.

Using finance from a legacy left by Thomas Clayton, it relocated to new premises in Northgate, designed by William Bakewell, in 1879. It joined the National Health Service as Clayton Hospital in 1948. After services had transferred to Pinderfields Hospital, it closed in 2012. A major fire took place at the derelict hospital in February 2017.

In July 2017 Queen Elizabeth Grammar School, Wakefield secured planning consent to refurbish the Victorian Tower but demolish the remainder of the buildings to create sports facilities.
