= Wakefield =

City in West Yorkshire, England

Coordinates: 53°40′57″N 1°29′51″W

- City
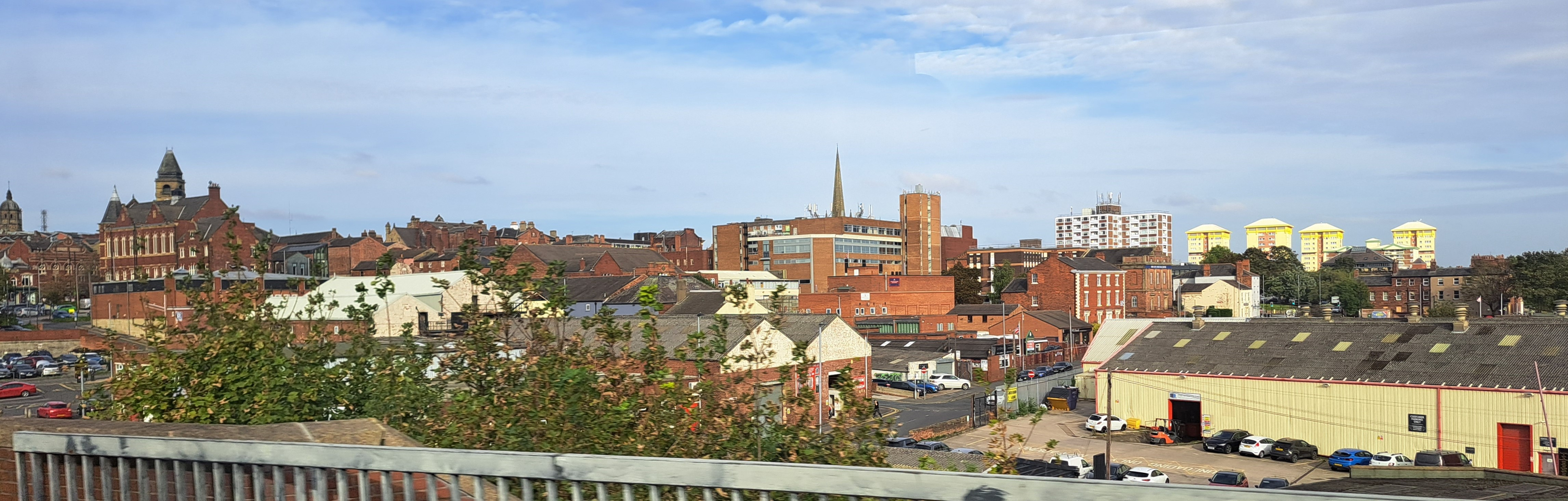
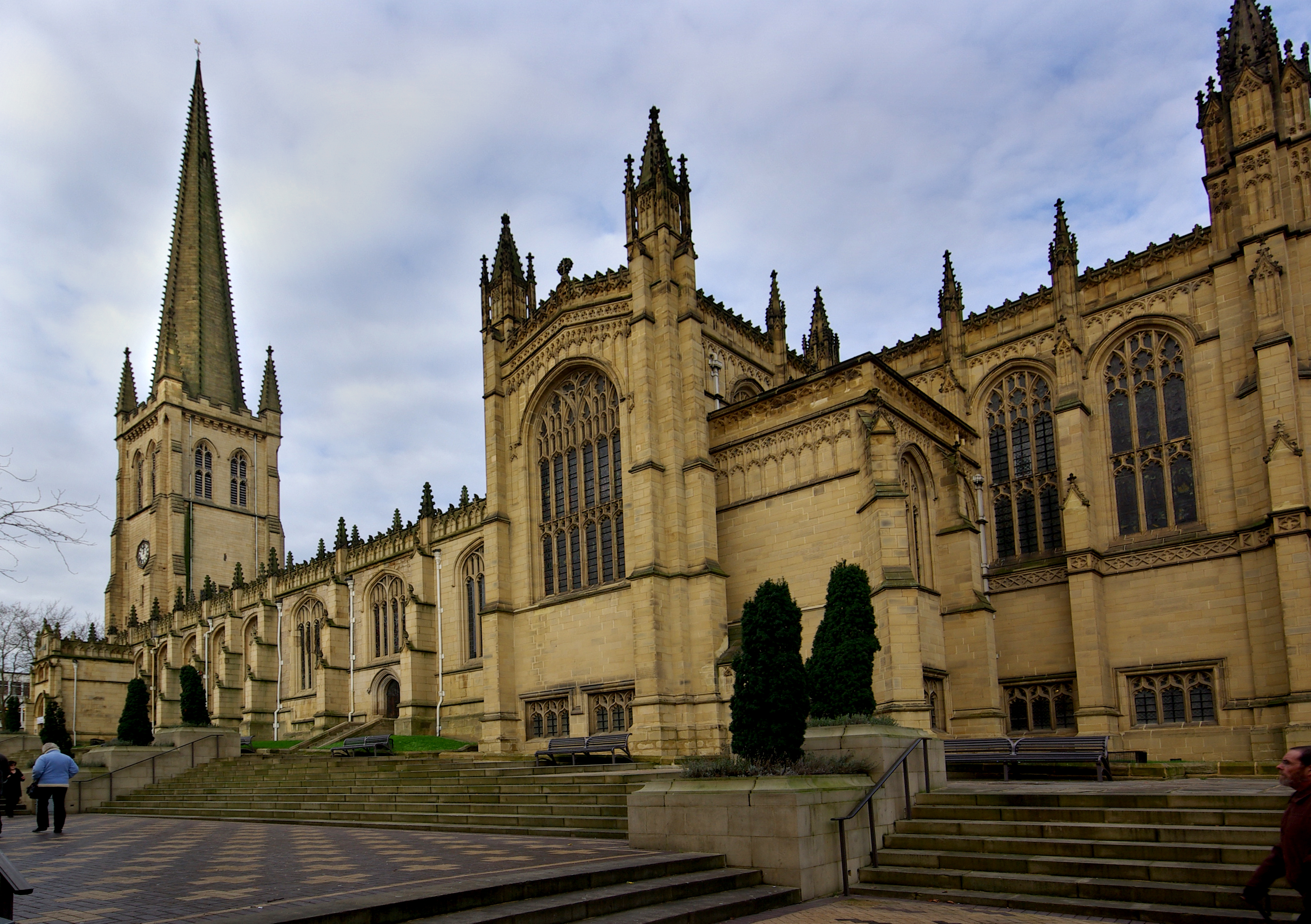
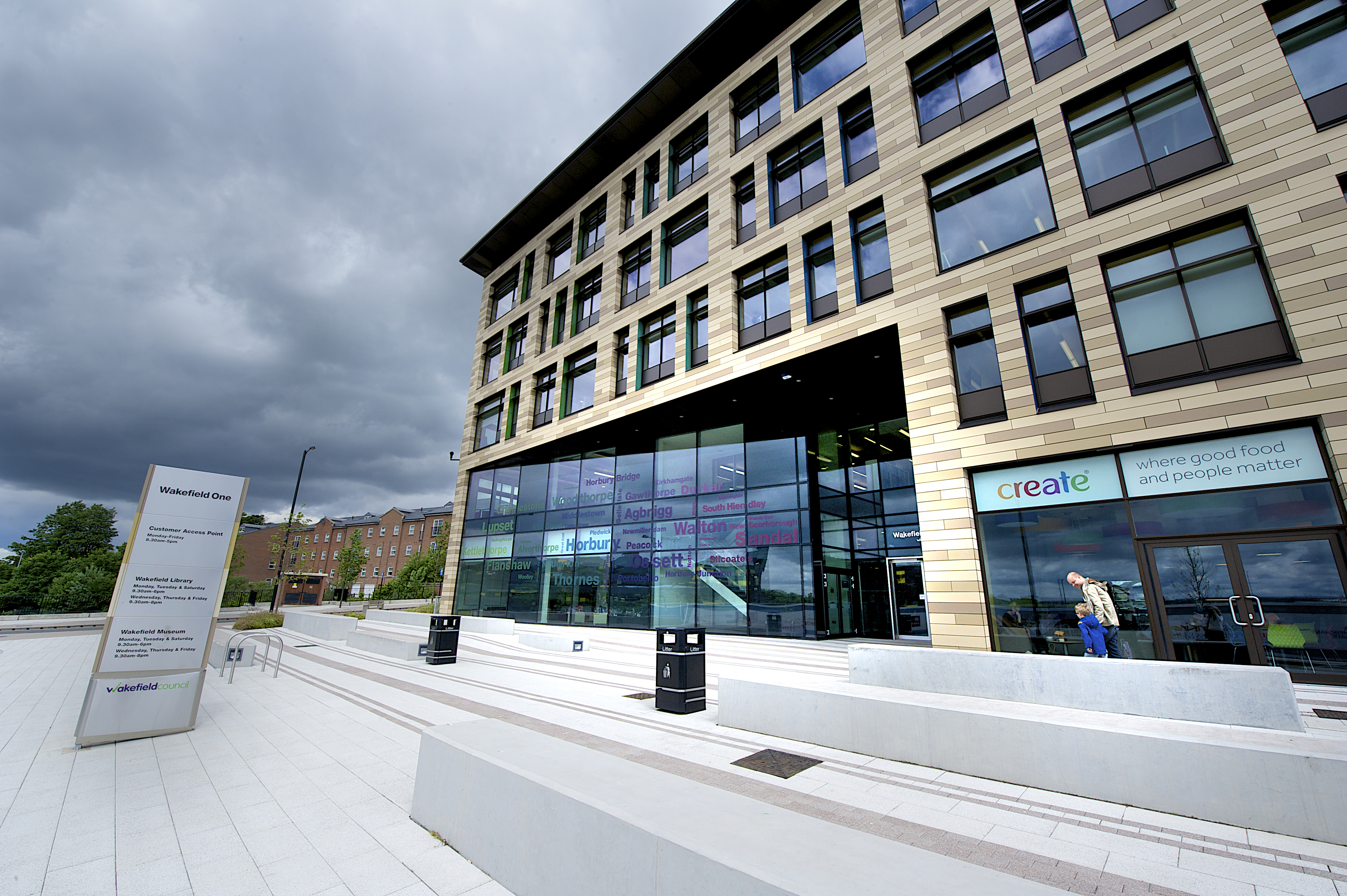
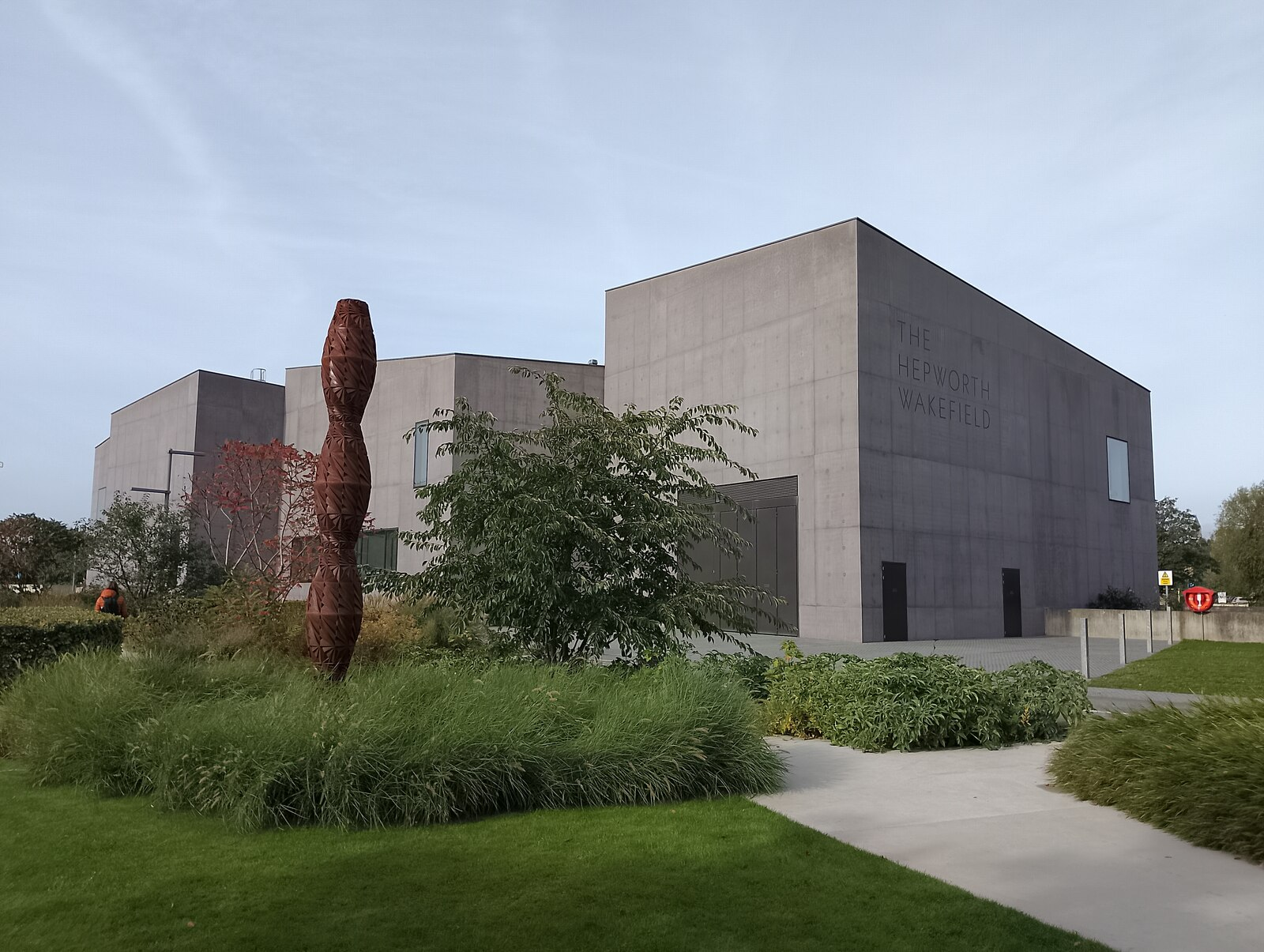
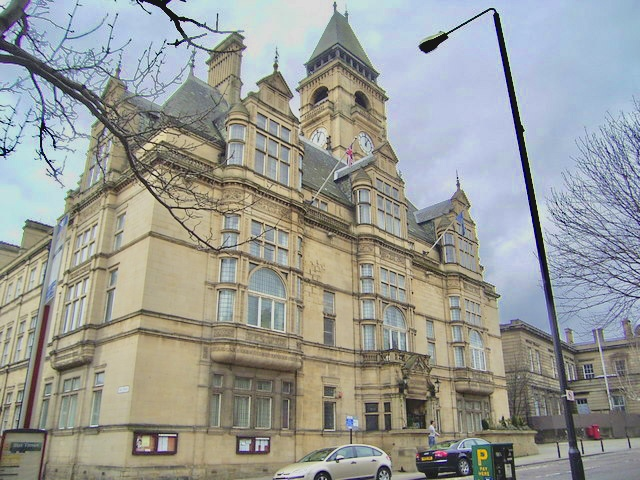
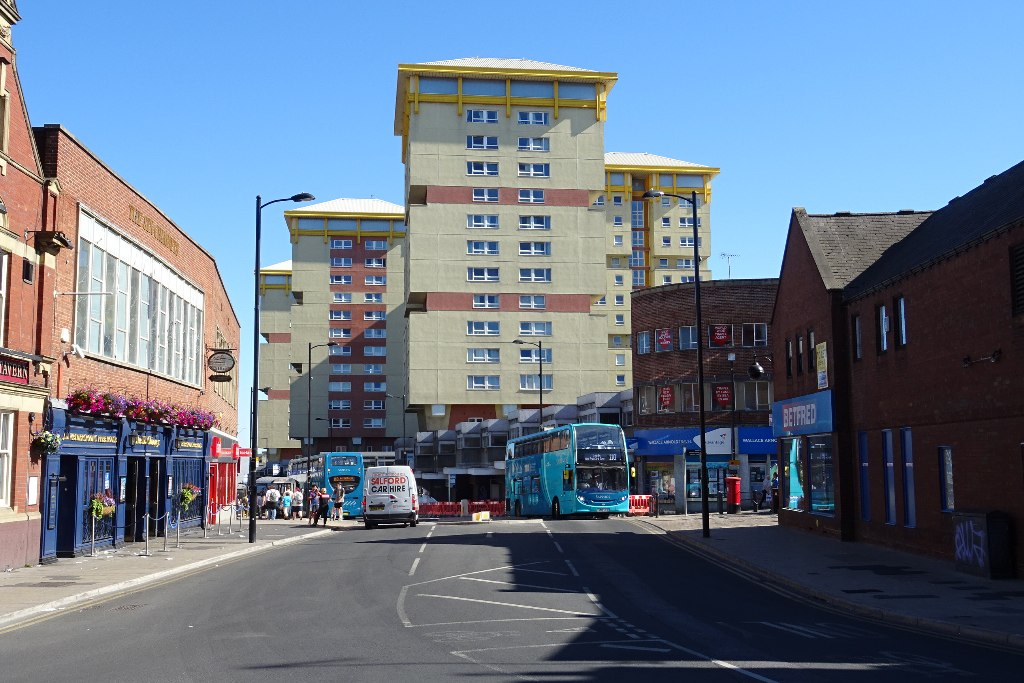
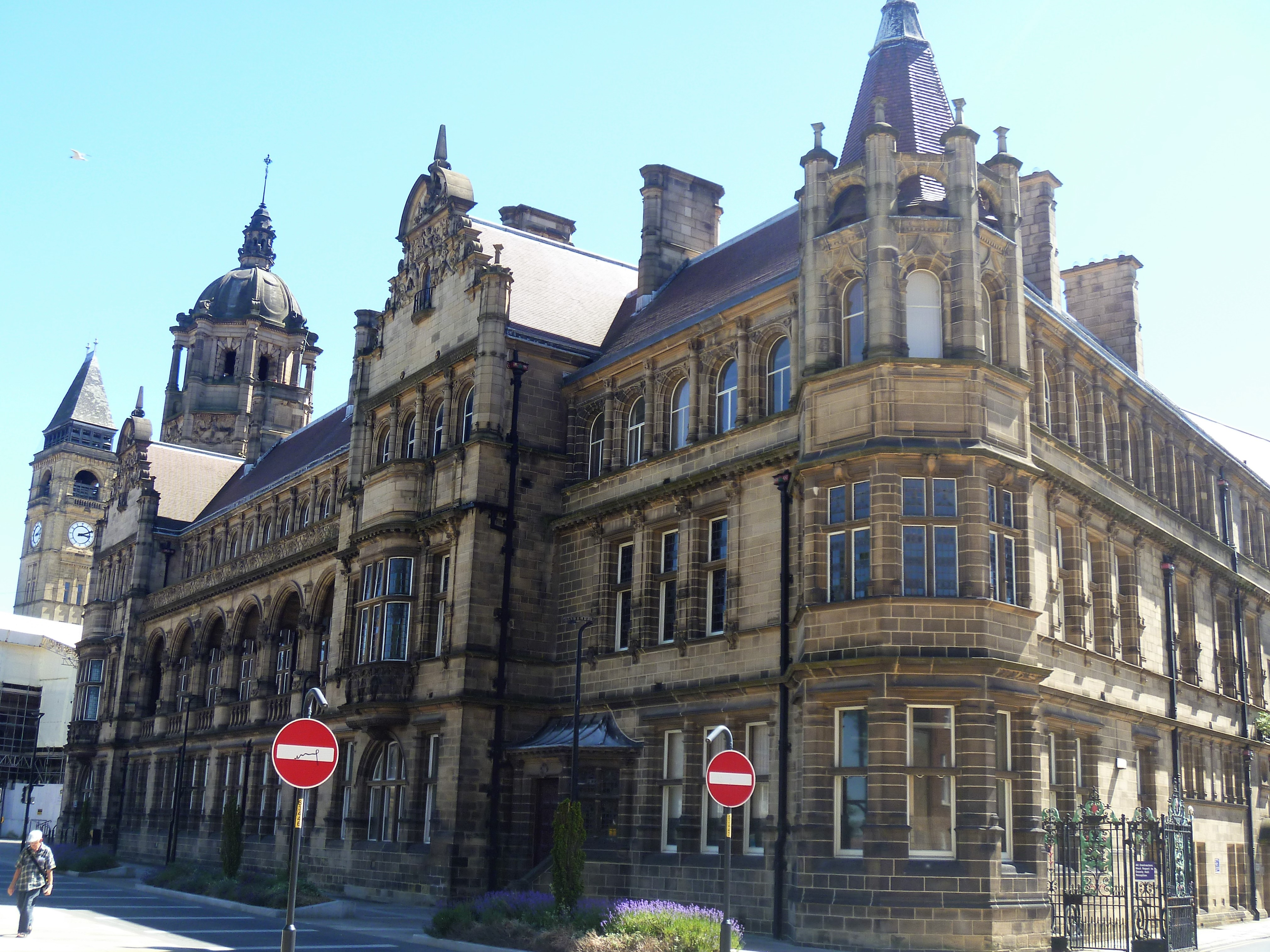
- Skyline of Wakefield city centre The Cathedral Wakefield Museum The Hepworth The Town Hall Kirkgate County Hall

- Coat of arms

- Location within West Yorkshire
- Area: 11.3 sq mi (29 km^{2})
- Population: 109,767 (2021)
  - Density: 9,714/sq mi (3,751/km^{2})
- OS grid reference: SE335205
  - London: 160 mi
- Metropolitan borough: City of Wakefield
- Metropolitan county: West Yorkshire
- Region: Yorkshire and the Humber
- Country: England
- Sovereign state: United Kingdom
- Post town: WAKEFIELD
- Postcode district: WF1-WF4
- Dialling code: 01924
- Police: West Yorkshire
- Fire: West Yorkshire
- Ambulance: Yorkshire
- UK Parliament: Wakefield and Rothwell; Ossett and Denby Dale

Wakefield is a cathedral city (Note: The area that is the subject of this article does not have legal city status of itself, but is widely regarded as a city since it is the main and nominate settlement in the City of Wakefield local government area) in West Yorkshire, England, located on the River Calder. The city had a population of 109,766 in the 2021 census, up from 99,251 in the 2011 census. The city is the administrative centre of the wider Metropolitan Borough of Wakefield, which had a 2025 population of 369,450, the 26th most populous district in England. It is part of the West Yorkshire Built-up Area and the Yorkshire and the Humber region.

In 1888, it gained city status due to its cathedral. The city has a town hall and is home to the county hall, which was the former administrative centre of the city's county borough and metropolitan borough as well as county town for the West Riding of Yorkshire.

The Battle of Wakefield took place in the Wars of the Roses, and the city changed hands between the two sides in the Civil War. Wakefield became an important market town and centre for wool, exploiting its position on the navigable River Calder to become an inland port. In the 18th century, Wakefield traded in corn, coal and textiles.

== History ==
=== Toponymy ===
The name Wakefield may derive from 'Waca's field' – the open land belonging to someone named 'Waca' – or could have evolved from the Old English word wacu, meaning 'a watch or wake', and feld, an open field in which a wake or festival was held. In the Domesday Book of 1086, it was written Wachefeld and also as Wachefelt.

=== Early history ===
Flint and stone tools and later bronze and iron implements have been found at Lee Moor and Lupset in the Wakefield area showing evidence of human activity since prehistoric times. This part of Yorkshire was home to the Brigantes until the Roman occupation in AD 43. A Roman road from Pontefract passing Streethouse, Heath Common, Ossett Street Side, through Kirklees and on to Manchester crossed the River Calder by a ford at Wakefield near the site of Wakefield Bridge. A large group of coin moulds, the Lingwell Gate coin moulds, representing Romano-British coin forgery were found at Lingwell Gate between 1697 and 1879. Wakefield was probably occupied again, this time by the Angles, in the 5th or 6th century, and after AD 876 the area was controlled by the Vikings who founded twelve hamlets or thorpes around Wakefield. (Note: Wakefield's thorpes are: Alverthorpe, Chapelthorpe, Gawthorpe, Hollingthorpe, Kettlethorpe, Kirkthorpe, Milnthorpe, Ouchthorpe, Painthorpe, Snapethorpe, Woodthorpe, Wrenthorpe. Flanshaw, Kirkhamgate, Carrgate and Lupset have Old Norse origins.) They divided the area into wapentakes and Wakefield was part of the Wapentake of Agbrigg. The settlement grew near a crossing place on the River Calder around three roads, Westgate, Northgate and Kirkgate. The "gate" suffix derives from Old Norse gata meaning road and kirk, from kirkja indicates there was a church.

Before 1066 the manor of Wakefield belonged to Edward the Confessor and it passed to William the Conqueror after the Battle of Hastings. After the Conquest Wakefield was a victim of the Harrying of the North in 1069 when William the Conqueror took revenge on the local population for resistance to Norman rule. The settlement was recorded as Wachfeld in the Domesday Book of 1086, and covered a much greater area than present day Wakefield, much of which was described as "waste". The manor was granted by the Crown to William de Warenne, 1st Earl of Surrey whose descendants, the Earls Warenne, inherited it after his death in 1088. The construction of Sandal Castle began early in the 12th century. A second castle, Wakefield Castle, was built at Lawe Hill on the north side of the Calder but was abandoned. Wakefield and its environs formed the caput of an extensive baronial holding by the Warennes that extended to Cheshire and Lancashire. The Warennes, and their feudal sublords, held the area until the 14th century, when it passed to their heirs. Norman tenants holding land in the region included the Lyvet family at Lupset.

The Domesday Book recorded two churches, one in Wakefield and one in Sandal Magna. The Saxon church in Wakefield was rebuilt in about 1100 in stone in the Norman style and was continually enlarged until 1315 when the central tower collapsed. By 1420 the church was again rebuilt and was extended between 1458 and 1475.

In 1203 William de Warenne, 5th Earl of Surrey received a grant for a market in the town. In 1204 King John granted the rights for a fair at the feast of All Saints, 1 November, and in 1258 Henry III granted the right for a fair on the feast of Saint John the Baptist, 24 June. The market was close to the Bull Ring and the church. The townsfolk of Wakefield amused themselves in games and sports: the chief sport in the 14th century was archery, and the butts in Wakefield were at the Ings, near the river. Wakefield was dubbed the "Merrie City" in the Middle Ages.

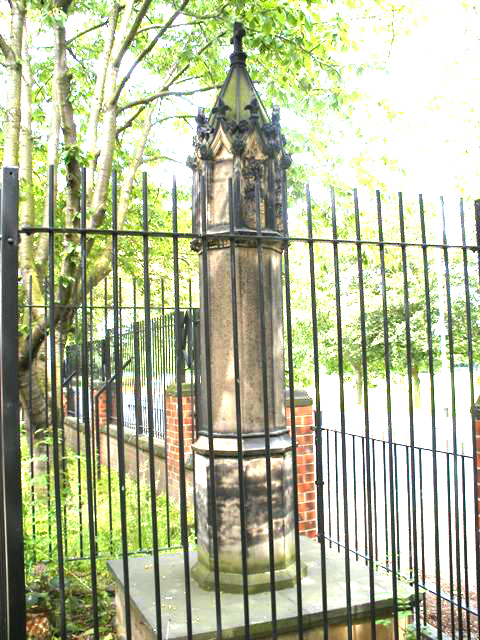
Memorial to the Duke of York, killed in battle, 1460

During the Wars of the Roses, Richard Plantagenet, Duke of York was killed on 30 December 1460 in the Battle of Wakefield, near Sandal Castle. In medieval times Wakefield became an inland port on the Calder and centre for the woollen and tanning trades. In 1538 John Leland described Wakefield as "a very quick market-towne and meately large; well served of flesch and fisch, both from the se and by rivers, whereof divers be thereabout at hande, so that al vitaile is very gode chepe there. A right honest man shal fare well for two pens a meale". As preparation for the impending invasion by the Spanish Armada in April 1588, 400 men from the wapentake of Morley and Agbrigg were summoned to Bruntcliffe near Morley with their weapons. Men from Kirkgate, Westgate, Northgate and Sandal were amongst them and all returned by August.

At the time of the Civil War, Wakefield was a military front line between the Parliamentarians and the Royalists. An attack led by Sir Thomas Fairfax on 20 May 1643 captured the town for the Parliamentarians. Over 1500 troops were taken prisoner along with the Royalist commander, Lieutenant-General Goring.

In 1699 an Act of Parliament was passed creating the Aire and Calder Navigation which provided the town with access to the North Sea. The first Registry of Deeds in the country opened in 1704 and in 1765 Wakefield's cattle market was established and became the one of largest in the north of England. The town was a centre for cloth dealing, with its own piece hall, the Tammy Hall, built in 1766. In the late 1700s Georgian town houses and St John's Church were built to the north of the town centre.

=== Industrial Revolution ===
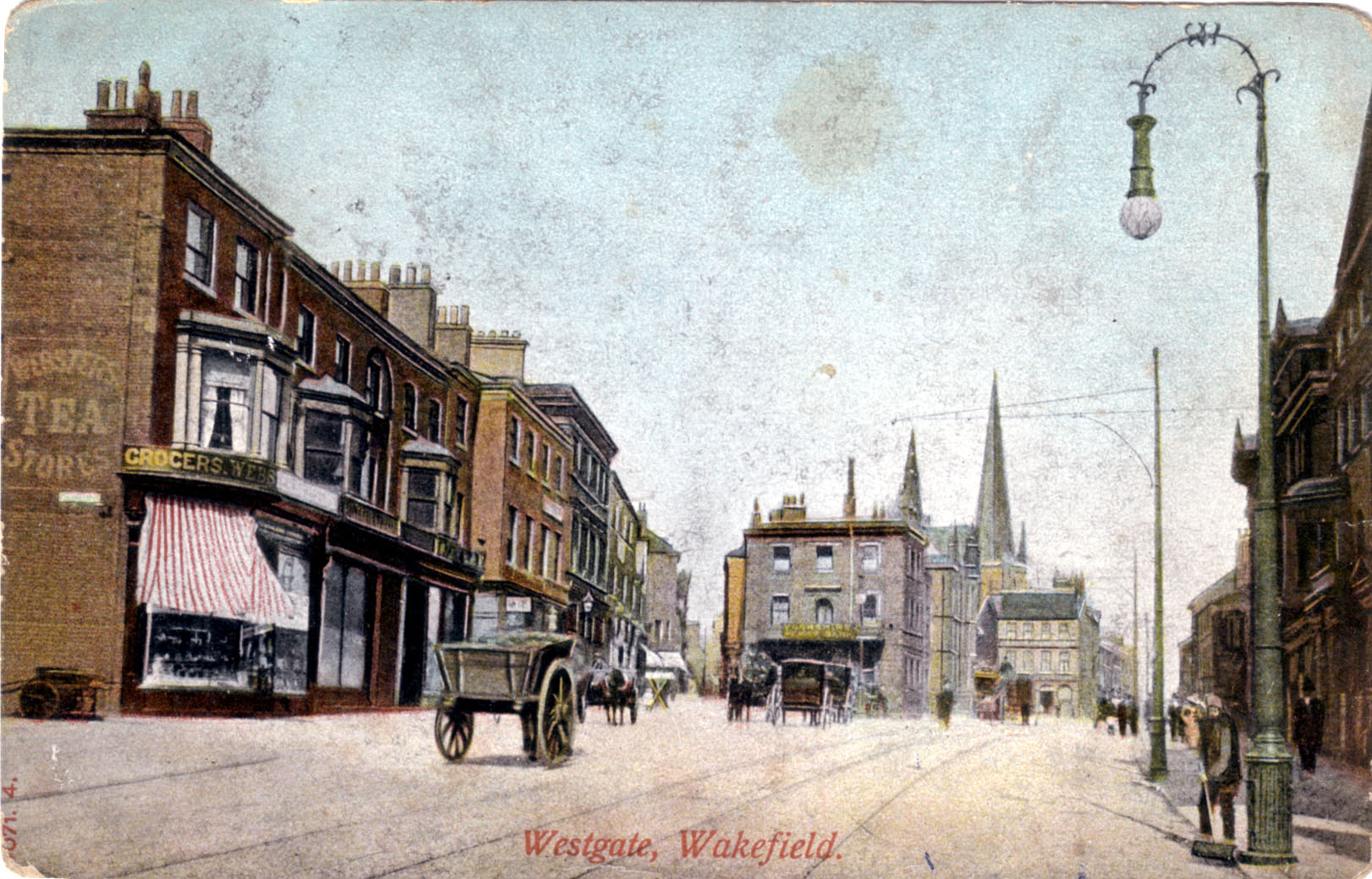
Wakefield Westgate c. 1900

At the start of the 19th century Wakefield was a wealthy market town and inland port trading in wool and grain. The Aire and Calder and Calder and Hebble Navigations and the Barnsley Canal were instrumental in the development of Wakefield as an important market for grain and more was sold here than at any other market in the north. Large warehouses were built on the river banks to store grain from Norfolk, Cambridgeshire and Lincolnshire to supply the fast-growing population in the West Riding of Yorkshire. Great quantities of barley were grown in the neighbourhood and in 1885 more malt was made in Wakefield "than in any district of equal extent in the kingdom". The market developed in the streets around the Bull Ring, and the cattle market between George Street and Ings Road grew to be one of the biggest in the country. Road transport using turnpiked roads was important. Regular mail coaches departed to Leeds, London, Manchester, York and Sheffield and the 'Strafford Arms' was an important coaching inn. The railways arrived in Wakefield in 1840 when Kirkgate station was built on the Manchester and Leeds Railway.

When cloth dealing declined, wool spinning mills using steam power were built by the river. There was a glass works in Calder Vale Road, several breweries including Melbourne's and Beverley's Eagle Breweries, engineering works with strong links to the mining industry, soapworks and brickyards in Eastmoor, giving the town a diverse economy. Boats and sloops were built at yards on the Calder. On the outskirts of the town, coal had been dug since the 15th century and 300 men were employed in the town's coal pits in 1831. During the 19th century more mines were sunk so that there were 46 small mines in Wakefield and the surrounding area by 1869. The National Coal Board eventually became Wakefield's largest employer with Manor Colliery on Cross Lane and Park Hill colliery at Eastmoor surviving until 1982. Wakefield was also the site of the founding of the Miners' Association of Great Britain and Ireland, the country's first national trade union for miners, in 1842.

During the 19th century Wakefield became the administrative centre for the West Riding, when many familiar buildings were constructed. The first civic building in Wood Street, Wakefield Court House, was built in 1810. The West Riding Pauper Lunatic Asylum was built at Stanley Royd, just outside the town on Aberford Road in 1816. During the 19th century, the Wakefield Asylum played a central role in the development of British psychiatry, with Henry Maudsley and James Crichton-Browne amongst its medical staff. Most of it is now demolished. The old House of Correction of 1595 was rebuilt as Wakefield Prison in 1847. Wakefield Union workhouse was built on Park Lodge Lane, Eastmoor in 1853 and Clayton Hospital was built in 1854 after a donation from Alderman Thomas Clayton. Wakefield Mechanics' Institute containing an Assembly Room, public library and newsroom supported by subscription was built in Wood Street in 1820–1821 in the Classical style with Ionic details. Wakefield Literary Society ran there from 1827 until the 20th century and its Geological Society left artefacts to Wakefield Museum.

Up to 1837 Wakefield relied on wells and springs for its water supply; water from the River Calder was polluted, and various water supply schemes were unsuccessful until reservoirs on the Rishworth Moors and a service reservoir at Ardsley were built providing clean water from 1888. By 1885 the streets of the town were paved and flagged and lit with gas supplied by a company incorporated in 1822. Between 1870 and 1885 they made improvements on the north side of town around St John's Church now a conservation area.

=== 20th century ===
On 2 June 1906, Andrew Carnegie opened a new Wakefield Library on Drury Lane which had been built with a grant of £8,000 from the Carnegie Trust.

There are seven ex-council estates in Wakefield which the council started to build after the First World War, the oldest is Portobello, the largest is Lupset and the rest are Flanshaw, Plumpton, Peacock, Eastmoor and Kettlethorpe. Homes not bought by occupants under the Right to Buy scheme were transferred to a registered social landlord, Wakefield and District Housing (WDH) in 2005. The outlying villages of Sandal Magna, Belle Vue and Agbrigg have become suburbs of Wakefield.

The glass and textile industries closed in the 1970s and 1980s, and coal faced competition from alternative sources and demand decreased. The coal mines around Wakefield were amongst the first in Yorkshire to close under the government of Margaret Thatcher, which altered the national energy policy from a reliance on British coal and opposed the political power of the NUM. Between 1979 and 1983, the pits at Lofthouse, Manor, Newmarket, Newmillerdam, Parkhill and Walton all closed. As the Wakefield pits closed, the Selby Coalfield was being opened, many colliers in Wakefield accepted offers to transfer to the new pits which were built to facilitate commuting.

An April 2021 article in The Guardian discussed nearby Heath (or Heath Common), the "village of the [200 year old] mansions", located "around the edge of the green". These housed the wealthy merchants and business owners. The local newspaper published specifics about one of the mansions in March 2021: Dower House was built c. 1740; it was constructed for John Smyth by John Carr, of Yorkshire stone, and "retains many original features". It was intended to house widows. The Dower House is a Grade II*listed property; it was modified in the early 1800s.

The nearby Heath Hall, Heath, West Yorkshire, formerly known as Eshald House, was also built c. 1709 for the wealthy wool trader, John Smyth. The Hall was modified by John Carr between 1754 and 1780 for the original owner's nephew (also known as John Smyth). The Hall is a Grade I listed building.

== Governance ==
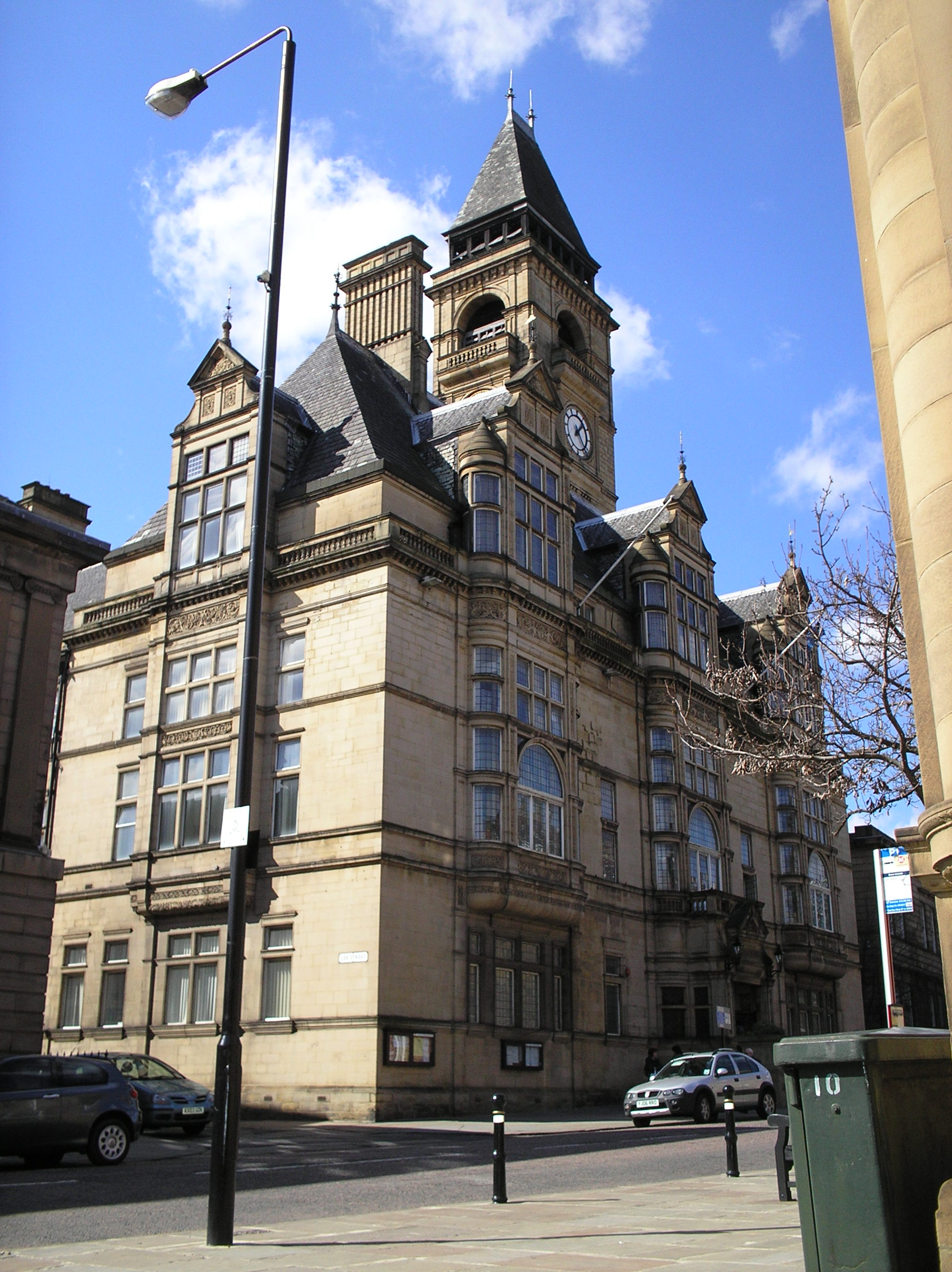
Wakefield Town Hall

Wakefield was anciently a market and parish town in the Agbrigg division of the wapentake of Agbrigg and Morley in the West Riding of Yorkshire. It became a parliamentary borough with one Member of Parliament after the Reform Act 1832. In 1836 the Wakefield Poor Law Union was formed following the Poor Law Amendment Act 1834 with an elected board of guardians. The town was incorporated as a municipal borough with elected councillors in 1848 under the Municipal Corporations Act 1835.

Wakefield was the de facto seat of regional government in Yorkshire for two centuries and became the county headquarters of the West Riding County Council created by the Local Government Act 1888. After Wakefield was elevated to a diocese in 1888, Wakefield council sought city status which was granted the same year. Wakefield became a county borough in 1913. In 1974, under the terms of the Local Government Act 1972, the county borough became defunct as it merged with surrounding local authorities to become the City of Wakefield district.

Today the city is the headquarters of Wakefield Metropolitan District Council, Yorkshire Ambulance Service and West Yorkshire Police. Since 1987, the district council has been based in County Hall.

Wakefield is covered by four electoral wards (Wakefield East, Wakefield North, Wakefield South and Wakefield West) of the Wakefield Metropolitan District Council. Each ward elects three councillors to the 63-member metropolitan district council, Wakefield's local authority. In 2015 all the councillors elected for Wakefield East, North and West were members of the Labour Party and the councillors for Wakefield South represent the Conservative Party.

The parliamentary seat of Wakefield had been held by the Labour Party continuously from 1932 until the 2019 general election, when the Conservative Party's Imran Ahmad Khan defeated the incumbent Mary Creagh. The Conservative Party expelled Khan from the party on 11 April 2022, following a conviction of sexual assault. He announced three days after his conviction that he would be resigning as an MP, and left his post on 3 May, triggering the 2022 Wakefield by-election, which was held on 23 June and won by Labour's Simon Lightwood.

The Wakefield South ward covering Sandal, Kettlethorpe, Agbrigg and Belle Vue, is in the Hemsworth constituency, represented by the Labour party's Jon Trickett since 1996. He was re-elected in May 2010, and returned in 2015 with 51.3% of the vote. The seat has been held by the Labour Party since its creation in 1918.

== Geography ==
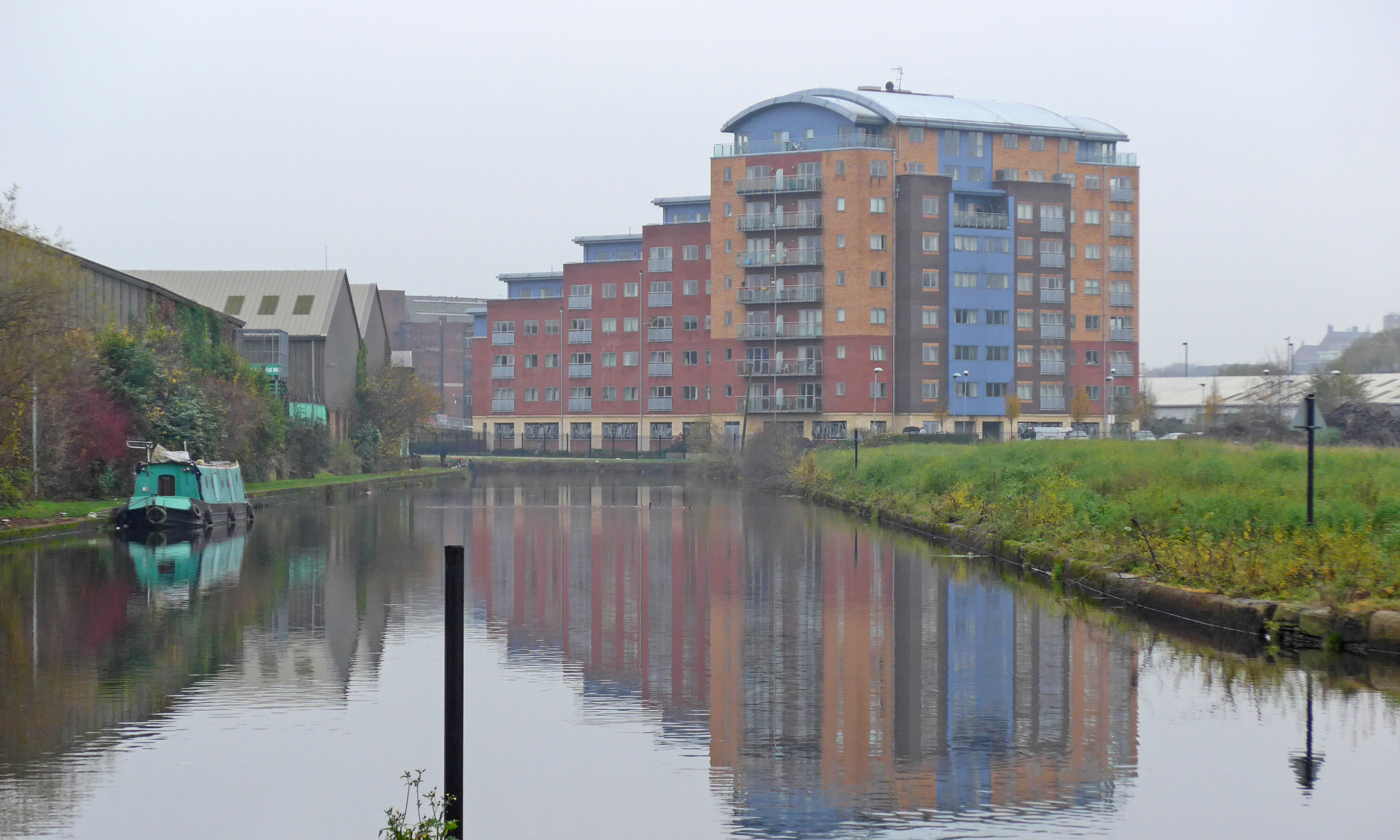
River Calder

Wakefield is 9 miles (14 km) south-east of Leeds and 28 miles (45 km) south-west of York on the eastern edge of the Pennines in the lower Calder Valley. The city centre is sited on a low hill on the north bank of the River Calder close to a crossing place where it is spanned by the 14th-century, nine-arched, stone Chantry Bridge and a reinforced concrete bridge built in 1929–1930. It is at the junction of major north–south routes to Sheffield, Leeds and Doncaster and west–east routes to Huddersfield, Dewsbury and Pontefract.

Wakefield is within the area of the Nottinghamshire, Derbyshire & Yorkshire coalfield and lies on the middle coal measures and sandstones laid down in the Carboniferous period.

Wakefield includes the former outlying villages of Alverthorpe, Thornes, Sandal, Portobello, Belle Vue, Agbrigg, Lupset, Kettlethorpe and Flanshaw. In the 2011 Census, Newton Hill, Outwood, Stanley and Wrenthorpe were counted as parts of Wakefield, having been classified separately in the 2001 Census.

Climate data for Wakefield
Month	Jan	Feb	Mar	Apr	May	Jun	Jul	Aug	Sep	Oct	Nov	Dec	Year
Mean daily maximum °C (°F)	7 (44)	7 (44)	9 (49)	12 (53)	16 (60)	18 (65)	21 (69)	21 (69)	17 (63)	13 (56)	9 (49)	7 (45)	13 (56)
Mean daily minimum °C (°F)	2 (36)	2 (36)	3 (37)	4 (39)	7 (45)	10 (50)	12 (54)	12 (54)	10 (50)	7 (45)	4 (39)	3 (37)	6 (44)
Average precipitation mm (inches)	87 (3.41)	64 (2.50)	68 (2.67)	62 (2.46)	56 (2.19)	67 (2.63)	51 (2.01)	64 (2.50)	64 (2.53)	74 (2.91)	78 (3.06)	92 (3.62)	827 (32.49)

== Demography ==
Wakefield Compared in 2008
2008 UK Population Estimates	Wakefield	Yorkshire and the Humber	England
Total population	322,300	5,213,200	51,446,200
White	95.7%	90.6%	88.2%
Asian	2.4%	5.7%	5.7%
Black	0.5%	1.3%	2.8%

In 2001 the Wakefield subdivision of the West Yorkshire Urban Area had a population of 76,886 comprising 37,477 males and 39,409 females. Also at the time of the 2001 UK census, the City of Wakefield had a total population of 315,172 of whom 161,962 were female and 153,210 were male. Of the 132,212 households in Wakefield, 39.56% were married couples living together, 28.32% were one-person households, 9.38% were cohabiting couples and 9.71% were lone parents. The figures for lone-parent households were slightly above the national average of 9.5%, and the percentage of married couples was above the national average of 36.5%; the proportion of one-person households was below the national average of 30.1%.

The population density was 9.31/km^{2} (24.1/sq mi). Of those aged 16–74 in Wakefield, 39.14% had no academic qualifications, much higher than 28.9% in all of England. Of Wakefield's residents, 2.53% were born outside the United Kingdom, significantly lower than the national average of 9.2%. The largest minority group was recorded as Asian, at 1.41% of the population.

The number of theft-from-a-vehicle offences and theft of a vehicle per 1,000 of the population was 7.9 and 3.9 compared to the English national average of 6.3 and 2.3 respectively. The number of sexual offences was 0.9, in line with the national average. The national average of violence against another person was 16.7 compared to the Wakefield average of 15. The figures for crime statistics were all recorded during the 2008–09 financial year.

=== Population change ===
Wakefield had a population of 76,886 in 2001. At the 2011 Census, the population was given as 99,251. However, these two estimates are not directly comparable, as the 2001 Census did not classify the old Stanley Urban District as part of Wakefield whereas the 2011 Census classified all settlements in this area except Bottom Boat (a small village built for Newmarket Colliery workers) as parts of Wakefield.

Population growth in Wakefield from 1881 to 1961
Year	1881	1891	1901	1911	1921	1931	1939	1951	1961
Population	22,173	23,315	24,107	43,588	52,891	59,122	56,963	60,371	61,268
Wakefield RSD 1881 – 1911 Wakefield MB/CB 1921 – 1961

== Economy ==
Wakefield Compared
2001 UK Census	Wakefield	WY Urban Area	England
Population (16–74)	55,789	1,072,276	35,532,091
Full-time employment	39.7%	39.5%	40.8%
Part-time employment	12.4%	12.1%	11.8%
Self employed	6.7%	6.3%	8.3%
Unemployed	4.1%	3.8%	3.3%
Retired	14.1%	12.8%	13.5%
Source: Office for National Statistics

The economy of Wakefield declined in the last quarter of the 20th century as the coal mines and traditional manufacturing industries closed, contributing to high rates of unemployment. In the Index of Multiple Deprivation 2015, 14.35% of the district's lower super-output areas were in the most deprived 10% of England.

Employment grew by 12% between 1998 and 2003 as the economy recovered and enjoyed growth as the economic base of the district was diversified. Growth has been supported by inward investment from European and United Kingdom government funding which has impacted on the regeneration of the area. Manufacturing remains an important employment sector although the decline is projected to continue whilst distribution and the service industries are now among the main employers.

At the 2001 census, there were 33,521 people in employment who were resident within Wakefield. Of these, 20.74% worked in the wholesale and retail trade, including repair of motor vehicles; 14.42% worked within manufacturing industry; 11% worked within the health and social work sector and 6.49% were employed in the transport, storage and communication industries. Wakefield is a member of the Leeds City Region Partnership, a sub-regional economic development partnership covering an area of the historic county of Yorkshire.

=== Regeneration ===
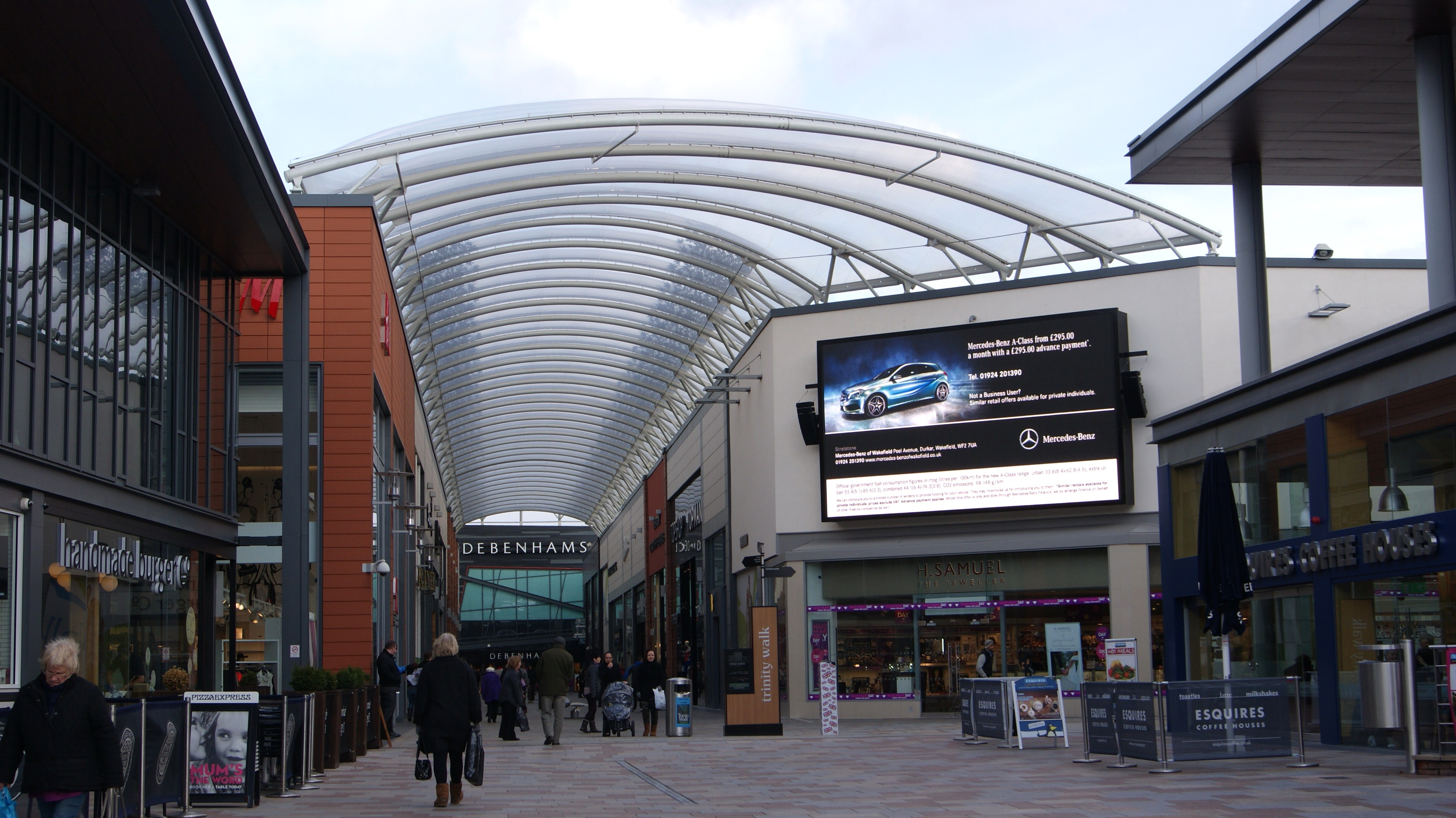
Trinity Walk shopping centre

Regeneration projects in Wakefield included the Trinity Walk retail development to the north east of the city centre, including a department store, a supermarket and shop units. Work began in autumn 2007 but was halted in 2009, restarted in 2010 and opened in 2011. The central square at the Bull Ring has been redesigned with a water feature and the Ridings Shopping Centre refurbished. Wakefield Westgate Station goods yard and land on Westgate and Balne Lane have been developed to create retail, residential and commercial space including new offices, a multi-storey carpark serving the station, and a hotel.

A new market hall opened in 2008, but closed in 2018. In 2023, conversion began of it into Wakefield Exchange, an events space.

Developments by the river and canal, the "Wakefield Waterfront", include the refurbishment of the Grade II listed Navigation Warehouse and office, retail, restaurant and cafe units. The development includes the art gallery, The Hepworth Wakefield named in honour of local sculptor, Barbara Hepworth which opened in May 2011. The gallery has ten internal spaces, exhibiting many examples of Hepworth's work. The gallery added about £10 million to the local economy by attracting 500,000 visitors in its first year. Flats and offices were built at Chantry Waters, on an island between the river and canal.

== Landmarks ==
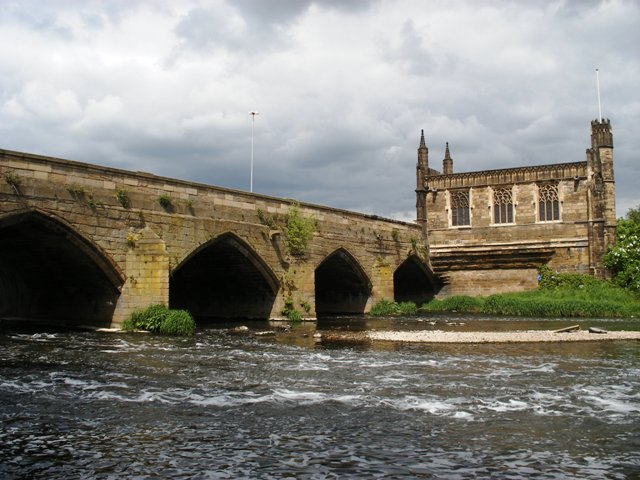
Chantry Bridge over the River Calder

The most prominent landmark in Wakefield is Wakefield Cathedral, which at 247 feet (75 m) has the tallest spire in Yorkshire. Other landmarks in the Civic Quarter on Wood Street include the Grade II*Neoclassical Crown Court of 1810, Wakefield Town Hall designed by T.E. Collcutt and opened in 1880, and the County Hall of 1898 built in a Queen Anne Style which are Grade I listed. St John's Church and Square, St John's North and South Parade are part of residential development dating from the Georgian period.

The old Wakefield Bridge with its Chantry Chapel, Sandal Castle, and Lawe Hill in Clarence Park are ancient monuments. Another prominent structure is the 95-arch railway viaduct, constructed of 800,000,000 bricks in the 1860s on the Doncaster to Leeds railway line. At its northern end is a bridge with an 80-foot (24 m) span over Westgate and at its southern end a 163-foot (50 m) iron bridge crossing the River Calder.

The Ridings Centre, opened in 1983, was a UK first and served as a template for many shopping centres throughout the UK.

Clayton Hospital, a substantial Victorian edifice completed in 1880, closed in 2012 and has since been demolished.

== Transport ==
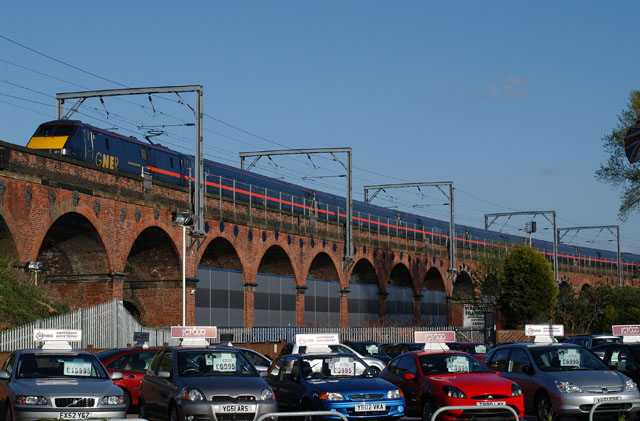
The brick-built 95-arch viaduct in Wakefield

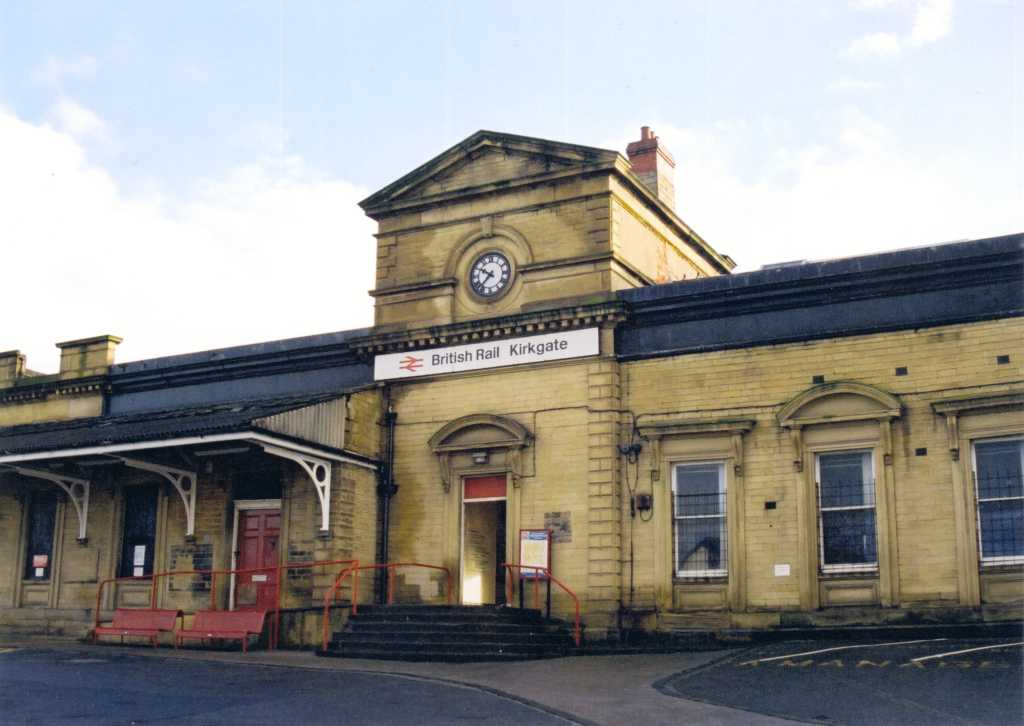
Wakefield Kirkgate railway station

Wakefield has good access to the motorway system, with the intersection of the M1 and M62 motorways, junctions 42/29, lying to the north west, whilst the M1 to the west is accessed at junctions 39, 40 and 41. The A1(M) is to the east of the district. Wakefield is crossed by the A61, A638, and A642 roads and is the starting point of the A636 and A650 roads.

The council is working with West Yorkshire Metro, the other four West Yorkshire district councils and transport operators to provide an integrated transport system for the district through the implementation of the West Yorkshire Local Transport Plan. A network of local buses, coordinated by West Yorkshire Metro and departing from Wakefield bus station in the town centre, serves Wakefield and district. Buses are operated by Arriva Yorkshire, Watersons Coaches, Poppletons, Team Pennine, Stagecoach Yorkshire and National Express.

Wakefield Westgate station opened in 1867 on the Doncaster to Leeds line. It has connections to the East Coast Main Line, trains to Leeds, Doncaster, and London King's Cross. CrossCountry trains go to Newcastle, Edinburgh, Birmingham and the South West. East Midlands Railway also run a limited service via Sheffield, Derby and Leicester to London St Pancras. Wakefield Westgate is on the Wakefield Line of the West Yorkshire Metro network. The line was electrified in 1989. Wakefield is served by inter-city express trains from both its railway stations. London can be reached in less than two hours.

Wakefield Kirkgate railway station was opened by the Manchester & Leeds Railway in 1840. Wakefield Kirkgate is unstaffed and operated by Northern who operate trains to Barnsley, Meadowhall Interchange, Sheffield, Normanton, Pontefract, Knottingley, Leeds, Castleford and Nottingham. The station serves the Hallam Line, Huddersfield Line and the Pontefract Line of the MetroTrain network. Grand Central operating between London King's Cross and Bradford Interchange stop at Kirkgate. In 2009 CCTV was installed at the station, but it had acquired a reputation for being one of the country's worst stations. It has, however, undergone extensive renovation (2014–).

The nearest airport is Leeds Bradford Airport, 19 miles (31 km) to the north of the city at Yeadon.

The Aire & Calder Navigation is 33 miles (53 km) from Leeds to Goole, and 7 1/2 miles (12 km) from Wakefield to Castleford, and was created by Act of Parliament in 1699. It was opened to Leeds in 1704 and to Wakefield in 1706, enabling craft carrying 100 tons to reach Wakefield from the Humber. It is still used by a small amount of commercial traffic and leisure craft. The Calder and Hebble Navigation was created by Act of Parliament in 1758 with the intention of making the Calder navigable to Sowerby Bridge. The route was originally surveyed by John Smeaton, remains open and is used by leisure craft. The Barnsley Canal, a broad canal with 20 locks, opened in 1799 connecting Barnsley to the Aire and Calder Navigation at Wakefield and was abandoned in 1953.

== Education ==
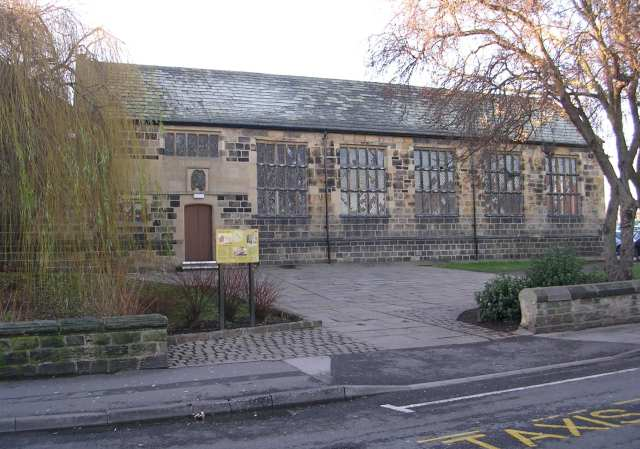
The original Queen Elizabeth Grammar School on Brook Street

Wakefield's oldest surviving school is Queen Elizabeth Grammar School, a boys-only school established in 1591 by Queen Elizabeth I by Royal Charter. The original building in Brook Street is now the Elizabethan Gallery. QEGS moved to Northgate in 1854. The school was administered by the Governors of Wakefield Charities who opened Wakefield Girls' High School on Wentworth Street in 1878. These two schools today are independent schools. National schools were opened by the Church of England including St Mary's in the 1840s and St John's in 1861. The original St Austin's Catholic School opened about 1838. A Methodist School was opened in Thornhill Street in 1846. Pinders Primary School, originally Eastmoor School is the only school opened as a result of the Education Act 1870 which remains open today.

Wakefield College has its origins in the School of Art and Craft of 1868 and today is the major provider of 6th form and further education in the area, with around 3,000 full-time and 10,000 part-time students, and campuses in the city and surrounding towns. In 2007 Wakefield City Council and Wakefield College announced plans to establish a University Centre of Wakefield but a bid for funding failed in 2009. Other schools with sixth forms include: QEGS, Wakefield Girls High School, and Cathedral High School, which is now a Performing Arts College for ages 11 to 18.

== Religion ==
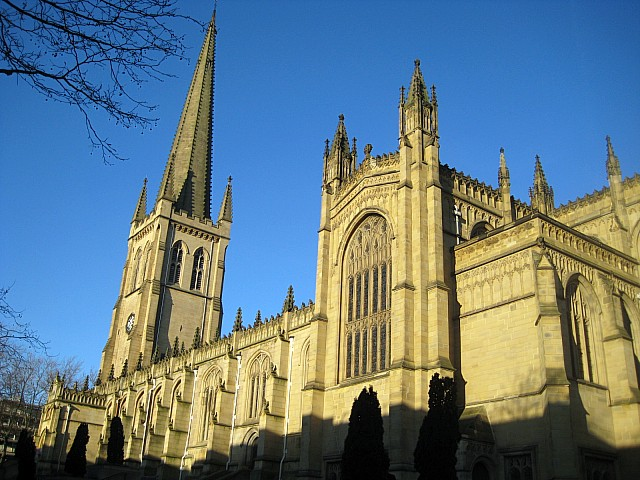
Wakefield Cathedral

Religion in Wakefield 2001
UK Census 2001	Wakefield	Yorkshire	England
Christian	78.21%	73.07%	71.74%
No religion	11.74%	14.09%	14.59%
Muslim	1.14%	3.81%	3.1%
Buddhist	0.10%	0.14%	0.28%
Hindu	0.20%	0.32%	1.11%
Jewish	0.04%	0.23%	0.52%
Sikh	0.08%	0.38%	0.67%
Other religions	0.18%	0.19%	0.29%
Religion not stated	7.57%	7.77%	7.69%

Wakefield's oldest church is All Saints, now Wakefield Cathedral, a 14th-century parish church built on the site of earlier Saxon and Norman churches, restored by Sir George Gilbert Scott in the 19th century, and raised to cathedral status in 1888. The first Bishop of Wakefield was William Walsham How. In 1356 the Chantry Chapel of St Mary the Virgin on Wakefield bridge was built originally in wood, and later in stone. This chapel is one of four chantry chapels built around Wakefield and the oldest and most ornate of the four surviving in England. Wakefield is also known for the Wakefield Cycle, a collection of 32 mystery plays, dating from the 14th century, which were performed as part of the summertime religious festival of Corpus Christi and revived in recent times.

St John's Church was built in 1795 in the Georgian style. Three new Anglican Commissioners' churches, partly financed by the "Million Fund" were built as chapels of ease in the surrounding districts and were St Peter at Stanley in 1824, St Paul at Alverthorpe in 1825, and St James at Thornes in 1831. Holy Trinity in George Street was built in 1838–9. St Andrew's Church opened on Peterson Road in 1846 and St Mary's Church on Charles Street was consecrated in 1864. St Michael's was consecrated in 1861.

The Westgate Unitarian Chapel dates from 1752. In the 19th century Wesleyan, Primitive and Independent Methodist chapels were opened and the Baptists opened a chapel in George Street in 1844. St John the Divine was built at Calder Grove in 1892.

The Church of England diocese of Wakefield covered parishes mainly in West Yorkshire, parts of South Yorkshire and five parishes in North Yorkshire. It was dissolved on Easter Sunday 2014. Stephen Platten was the 12th and last Bishop of Wakefield. The Diocese of Leeds now covers Wakefield.

Wakefield has two Catholic parishes – in the north St Martin de Porres incorporates the churches of St Austin's, Wentworth Terrace, opened in 1828, and English Martyrs, opened in 1932, on Dewsbury Road, Lupset, and in the south, St Peter and St Paul's off Standbridge Lane which has a modern church built in 1991. Wakefield is in the Roman Catholic Diocese of Leeds.

Agbrigg Muslim Association have a Zakaria Masjid Mosque in Wakefield.

== Culture ==
The Theatre Royal Wakefield on Westgate, was designed by architect Frank Matcham, and opened in 1894 as the Opera House, and currently presents a programme of entertainment including musicals, drama, live music, stand-up comedy and dance.

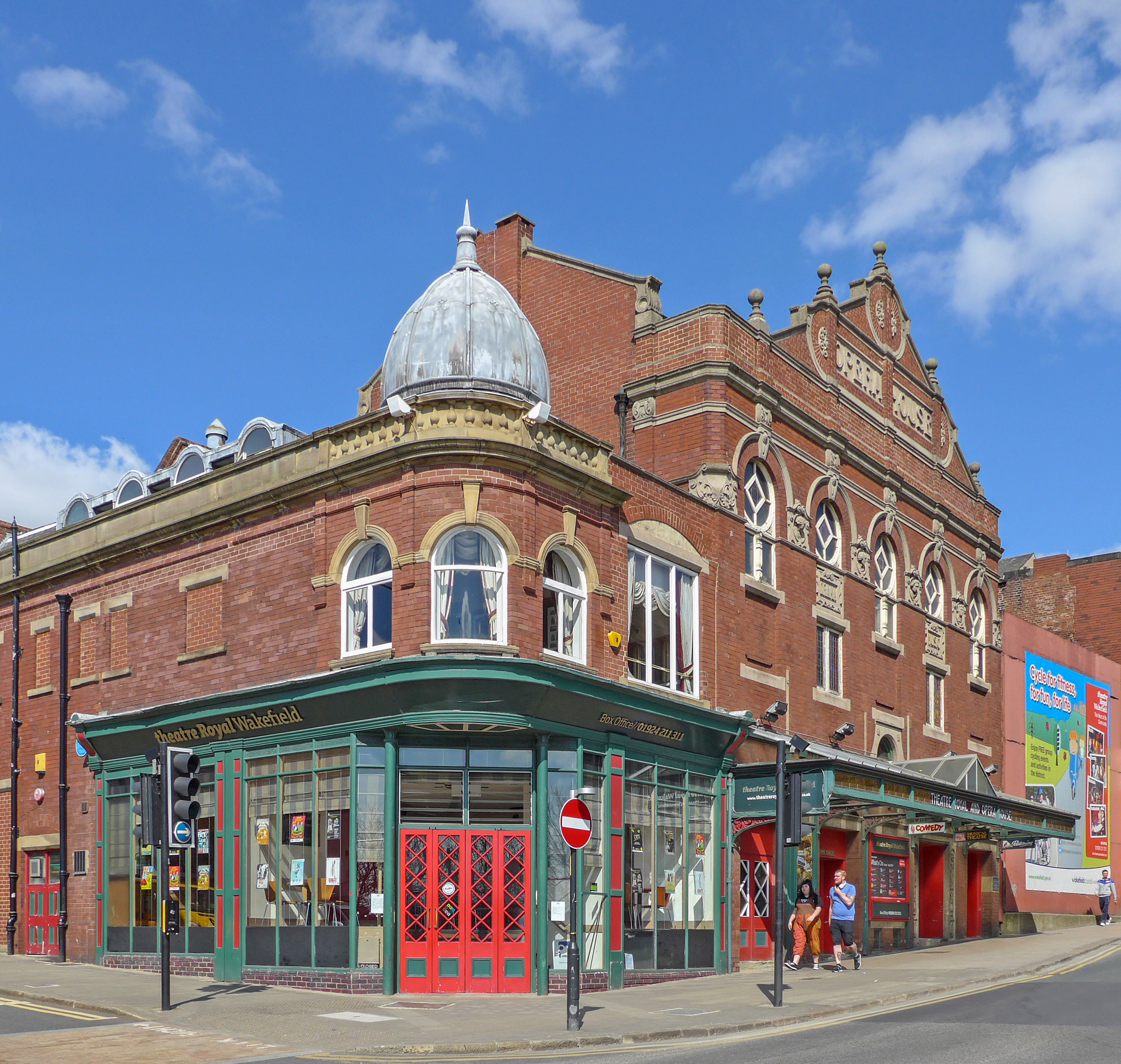
Theatre Royal

Wakefield's two central libraries moved into the £31 million Wakefield One in October 2012. The new library was officially opened by singer Jarvis Cocker on 10 November 2012. Wakefield Museum moved from the former Mechanics' Institute on Wood Street to Wakefield One at the same time. The museum was officially opened by Sir David Attenborough on 9 March 2013.

Balne Lane library once managed a regional collection of more than 500,000 items of music and 90,000 copies of plays for Yorkshire Libraries & Information (YLI). The Yorkshire Music and Drama Library at Balne Lane closed on 31 March 2012 when the music section moved to Huddersfield and the drama section to Leeds.

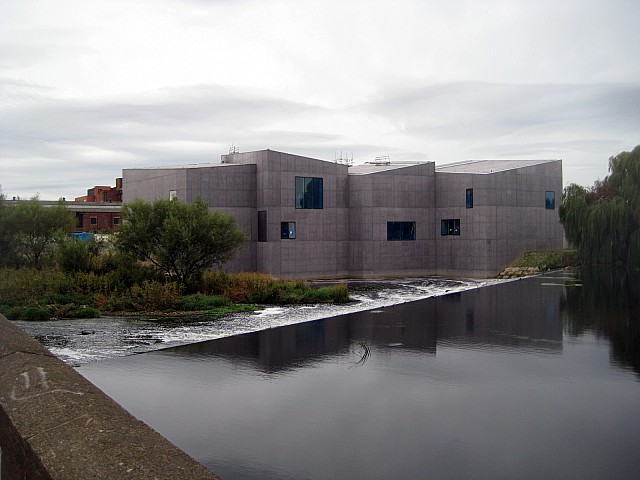
The Hepworth Wakefield and the River Calder

In May 2011 The Hepworth Wakefield gallery opened on the south bank of the River Calder near Wakefield Bridge, displaying work by local artists Barbara Hepworth and Henry Moore and other British and international artists. The gallery is thought to be the largest purpose-built gallery to open in the United Kingdom since 1968.

Wakefield's three adjoining parks have a history dating back to 1893 when Clarence Park opened on land near Lawe Hill. The adjacent Holmefield Estate was acquired in 1919, followed by Thornes House in 1924, becoming Holmefield Park and Thornes Park respectively. The three parks form Wakefield Park to the south west of the city. Clarence Park Music Festival is held annually in Clarence Park, promoting local bands.

Wakefield's newspaper, the Wakefield Express, was founded in 1852. Another newspaper, the Wakefield Guardian was established in 2007, but has ceased publishing.

Local news and television programmes is provided by BBC Yorkshire and ITV Yorkshire. Television signals are received from the Emley Moor TV transmitter.

Wakefield's local radio stations are BBC Radio Leeds, Heart Yorkshire, Capital Yorkshire and Ridings FM, was founded in 1999, and rebranded in September 2020 as Greatest Hits Radio West Yorkshire.

Wakefield is known as the capital of the Rhubarb Triangle, an area notable for growing early forced rhubarb. In July 2005 a sculpture was erected to celebrate this facet of Wakefield, and there is an annual 'Wakefield Festival of Food, Drink and Rhubarb" which takes place over the last weekend in February.

The West Riding Registry of Deeds on Newstead Road is the headquarters of the West Yorkshire Archive Service, housing records from the former West Riding and West Yorkshire counties, and is the record office for the Wakefield Metropolitan District.

In 1913 Albert Winstanley opened the Picture House cinema in Westgate. Shortly after opening it was renamed the Playhouse, and by 1972 it was part of the Classic cinema chain. It is now a nightclub.

In 1935 Associated British Cinemas (ABC) opened the Regal Cinema in Kirkgate. The Art Deco building was renamed the ABC in 1962 and became a Cannon in 1986. Cineworld's first purpose-built multiplex in Britain opened in Wakefield in December 1996. The ABC closed in 1997 and has remained derelict, but there have been successive proposals to redevelop or demolish it. The ABC cinema was finally and fully demolished in August 2023.

The British rock band the Beatles played at the ABC Cinema Wakefield on 7 February 1963 as part of the Helen Shapiro Winter Tour. The Cinema may still have been named the Regal at the time. This was their only performance in Wakefield and took place just a few days before the band recorded their first album Please Please Me.

=== Film and television locations ===
The 1963 film This Sporting Life starring Richard Harris, Rachel Roberts, William Hartnell and Arthur Lowe was partially filmed in Wakefield, specifically at Wakefield Trinity Rugby Ground, Belle Vue, the area around the top of Westgate and the demolished "Locarno Night Club" – Southgate, now the Cathedral entrance to Ridings Shopping Centre. The film's screenplay was by Wakefield born writer David Storey.

The 1996 film Brassed Off, starring Ewan McGregor, was partly filmed at The National Coal Mining Museum in Wakefield.

The 2018 television mini series The ABC Murders, starring John Malkovich, Eamon Farren, Michael Shaeffer and Rupert Grint, was partly filmed at St Johns Baptist's Church and St John's Square.

== Sport ==
=== Rugby ===
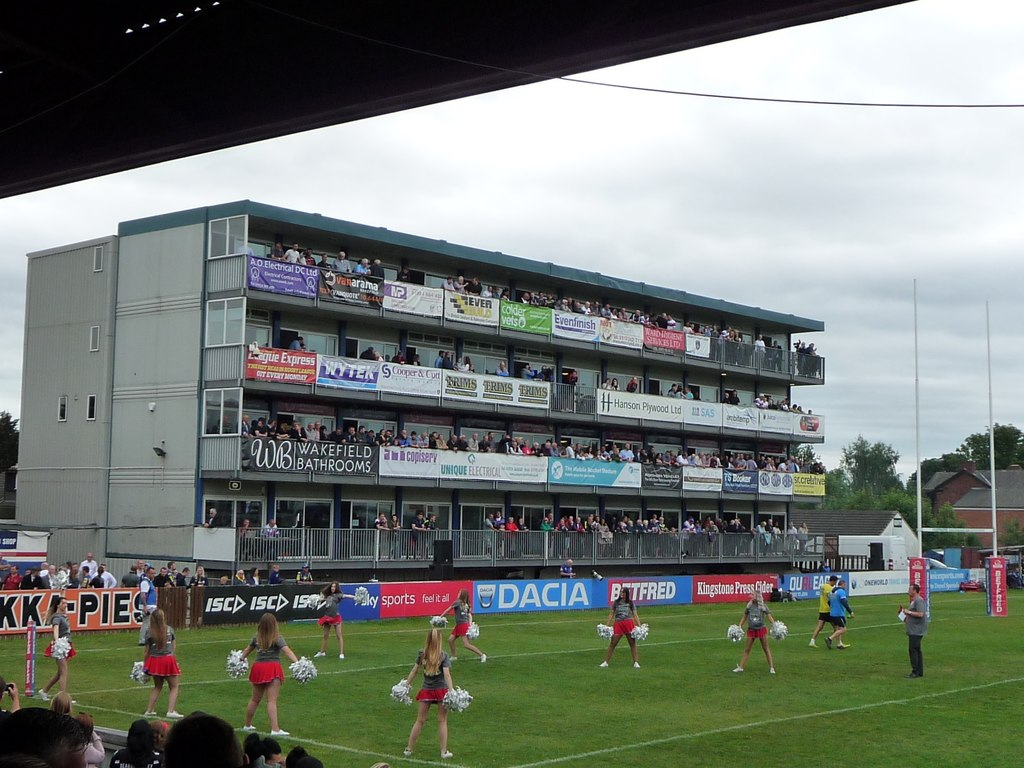
Belle Vue Stadium

Wakefield Trinity is a Rugby League club currently playing in the Super League following promotion from the Championship in 2024. In October 2026 they won the Super League Grand Final for the first time, beating Warrington Wolves 23-10 at Old Trafford.

The club, founded in 1873, was one of the initial founders of the Northern Union after the split from the Rugby Football Union in 1895. The club plays at Belle Vue stadium. Several local teams play in different leagues of the British Amateur Rugby League Association, BARLA. They include Wakefield City, Westgate Wolves, Crigglestone All Blacks, Kettlethorpe and Eastmoor Dragons.

Rugby Union Football is played at Sandal RUFC and was played by Wakefield RFC at College Grove from 1901 to 2004 when the club ceased to play.

=== Football ===
Wakefield briefly had a football team in the city itself when Emley F.C. moved to play at Belle Vue, the ground of Wakefield Trinity, hoping to progress further up the football pyramid. The team renamed itself to Wakefield F.C. in 2006. However, fortunes soon declined with supporters abandoning the club and they moved out of Belle Vue, first to College Grove and then briefly to share with Ossett Town, ultimately, Wakefield FC folded in June 2014 with crowds in the low double figures by then. AFC Emley was founded to restore the club's original links with the village of Emley. the fans who followed the old club soon went back to following the new (continuation of the old club) in Emley who have gone from strength to strength.

In 2019 a new club Wakefield A.F.C. was formed by a consortium including former professional player Chris Turner and played in the Sheffield & Hallamshire County Senior Football League, in 2021 the club was bought by VO2 capital. Playing at Barnsley and Featherstone, the club had not played in the City which bears their name until moving to share the rugby ground with Wakefield Trinity in 2023, however, this arrangement only lasted 1 season before Wakefield moved back out of the city and back to Featherstone leaving the city of Wakefield without a senior football club yet again and therefore remains the largest settlement in the UK without its own football club.

=== Other Sports ===
Wakefield Hockey Club and Slazenger Hockey Club (based in Horbury) are field hockey clubs that compete in the Men's England Hockey League, the North Hockey League and the Yorkshire & North East Hockey League.

Wakefield Sports Club at College Grove also has the Yorkshire Regional Hockey Academy, Wakefield Bowls Club and Wakefield Squash Club on the same site.

The Wakefield Archers meet at QEGS in Wakefield or at Slazengers Sports Club, Horbury and has archers shooting Olympic re-curve bows, compound bows and longbows. Thornes Park Athletics Stadium is home to Wakefield Harriers A.C. Members Martyn Bernard and Emily Freeman competed in the Beijing Olympics. Local teams Newton Hill and Wakefield Thornes are members of the Leeds-West Riding Cricket League.

There is a 100-acre (0.40 km^{2}) watersports lake at Pugneys Country Park catering for non-powered watersports such as canoeing, sailing and windsurfing. Golf clubs include the municipal course at Lupset and the private Wakefield Golf Club at Sandal.

The racing teams Optimum Motorsport and United Autosports are based in Wakefield. United Autosports competes in the World Endurance Championship, ELMS and the IMSA SportsCar Championship. While Optimum compete in the IMSA SportsCar Championship, ALMS, British GT and GT World Challenge Europe.

== Public services ==
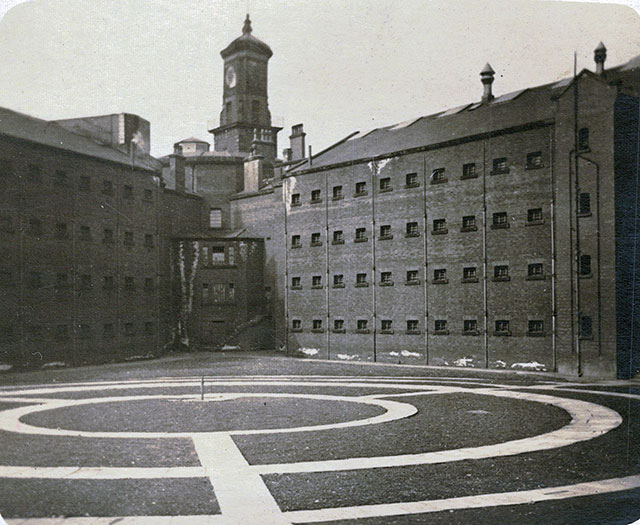
Wakefield Prison (1916)

Wakefield Prison, originally built as a house of correction in 1594, is a maximum security prison. Wakefield is policed by the West Yorkshire Police force and is within the DA, Wakefield division, which covers the whole district. Wakefield is also the location of the West Yorkshire Police Headquarters. The statutory emergency fire and rescue service is provided by the West Yorkshire Fire and Rescue Service, from Wakefield fire station.

Hospital services are provided by the Mid Yorkshire Hospitals NHS Trust and community health services, including GPs, district and community nurses, dentists and pharmacists, are coordinated by Wakefield District Primary Care Trust. Waste management is co-ordinated by the local authority. Wakefield's distribution network operator for electricity is CE Electric. Yorkshire Water manages Wakefield's drinking and wastewater.

== Notable people ==
- Joseph Aspdin, inventor of Portland Cement
- Sarah Whitley was born in Wakefield in 1816 and is credited as the earliest-born woman known to have appeared in a film, featuring in the Roundhay Garden Scene shot in 1888.
- Novelist George Gissing was born in Wakefield in 1857; his childhood home in Thompson's Yard is maintained by The Gissing Trust.
- Sculptor Barbara Hepworth was born in Wakefield in 1903. The art gallery The Hepworth Wakefield is named after her which features her work, alongside that of other local artists such as Henry Moore.
- Dame Marjorie Williamson was born in Wakefield in 1913. She was an academic, educator, physicist and university administrator.
- Composer and pianist Kenneth Leighton, born in Wakefield in 1929, grew up in Denstone Street.
- David Storey, born in Wakefield in 1933, was a novelist and playwright, whose 1960 This Sporting Life, was made into a 1963 film which was shot largely on location in the city.
- Anne Treisman (née Taylor, 1935–2018), a psychologist who specialised in cognitive psychology, was born in Wakefield.
- Former Archbishop of York, David Hope, Baron Hope of Thornes, was born in 1940 in Thornes.
- Jane McDonald, singer, was born in Wakefield in 1963.
- The Liberal Democrat politician John Leech was born in Wakefield in 1971. He was Member of Parliament for Manchester Withington from 2005 to 2015.
- Imran Ahmad Khan was born in Wakefield in 1973; former Member of Parliament (MP) for Wakefield; suspended and resigned; convicted child sex offender, contrary to section 3 of the Sexual Offences Act 2003.
- Amy Garcia, BBC Look North TV presenter, was born in Wakefield in 1981.

== Twin cities ==
Wakefield is twinned with:

- Alfeld (Leine), Germany (since 1958)
- Castres, France (since 1953)
- Castrop-Rauxel, Germany (since 1949)
- Girona, Spain (since 1990)
- Hénin-Beaumont, France (since 1972)
- Herne, Germany (since 1956)
- Konin, Poland (since 1996)

Wakefield was previously twinned with Xiangyang, China (2016–2020) and Nanning, China (2019–2020). Both relations were ended due to human rights concerns relating to the treatment of Uyghur Muslims.

Wakefield was also previously twinned with Belgorod, Russia (1991–2022), but this agreement was ended in response to the 2022 Russian invasion of Ukraine.

== Freedom of the City ==
The following people and military units have received the Freedom of the City of Wakefield.

=== Individuals ===
- Field Marshal Lord Montgomery of Alamein: 4 November 1947.
- James Benjamin Sykes: 18 May 1864.

=== Military units ===
- The King's Own Yorkshire Light Infantry: 1945.
- The Yorkshire Regiment: 13 March 2010.
- The Rifles: 11 September 2010.

== See also ==
- Listed buildings in Wakefield
- The Jolly Pinder of Wakefield
- Wakefield A.F.C. Women
- The Ridings Centre
