= Caphouse =

Caphouse, cap house or cap-house may refer to:

- Cap-house, an architectural feature of tower houses and castles, built at the top of a spiral staircase
- Caphouse Colliery, a disused coal mine in Overton, Wakefield, England
  - The National Coal Mining Museum for England, a museum at the site of Caphouse Colliery
