= Horace Fisher =

English cricketer (1903-1974)

Horace Fisher (3 August 1903 – 16 April 1974) was an English first-class cricketer, who played fifty two games for Yorkshire County Cricket Club between 1928 and 1936.

Born in Featherstone, Yorkshire, England, Fisher was a slow left arm bowler from Flockton Colliery, Wakefield, Yorkshire. He briefly challenged Hedley Verity for Wilfred Rhodes's vacated berth, but was soon overshadowed, and played only when Verity was on Test duties. He was a fine performer in his own right however, taking 93 wickets at 28.18. He was a useful batsman in the lower order, scoring 681 runs at an average of 15.47. He was awarded his Yorkshire cap in 1935.

He is notable as the first bowler to ever claim a hat trick of LBW victims, in the course of taking 5 for 12 against Somerset at Sheffield in August 1932. Umpire Alex Skelding, after dispatching Mandy Mitchell-Innes for five and then Bill Andrews first ball in the same manner, stared up the wicket at the new man Wally Luckes, when the third appeal was made. After a pregnant pause, he stated, "As God's my witness, that's out, too". In the same match, Fisher posted his highest ever first-class score in Yorkshire's only innings, an unbeaten 76, as Yorkshire ran out winners by an innings and 93. Earlier that week Fisher took six wickets for 11 runs, against Leicestershire at Bradford, which remained his best bowling return.

Fisher died in April 1974, in Middlestown, Horbury, Yorkshire, at the age of 70.
