= Sitlington =

Civil parish in Wakefield, West Yorkshire, England

Coordinates: 53.64°N 1.58°W

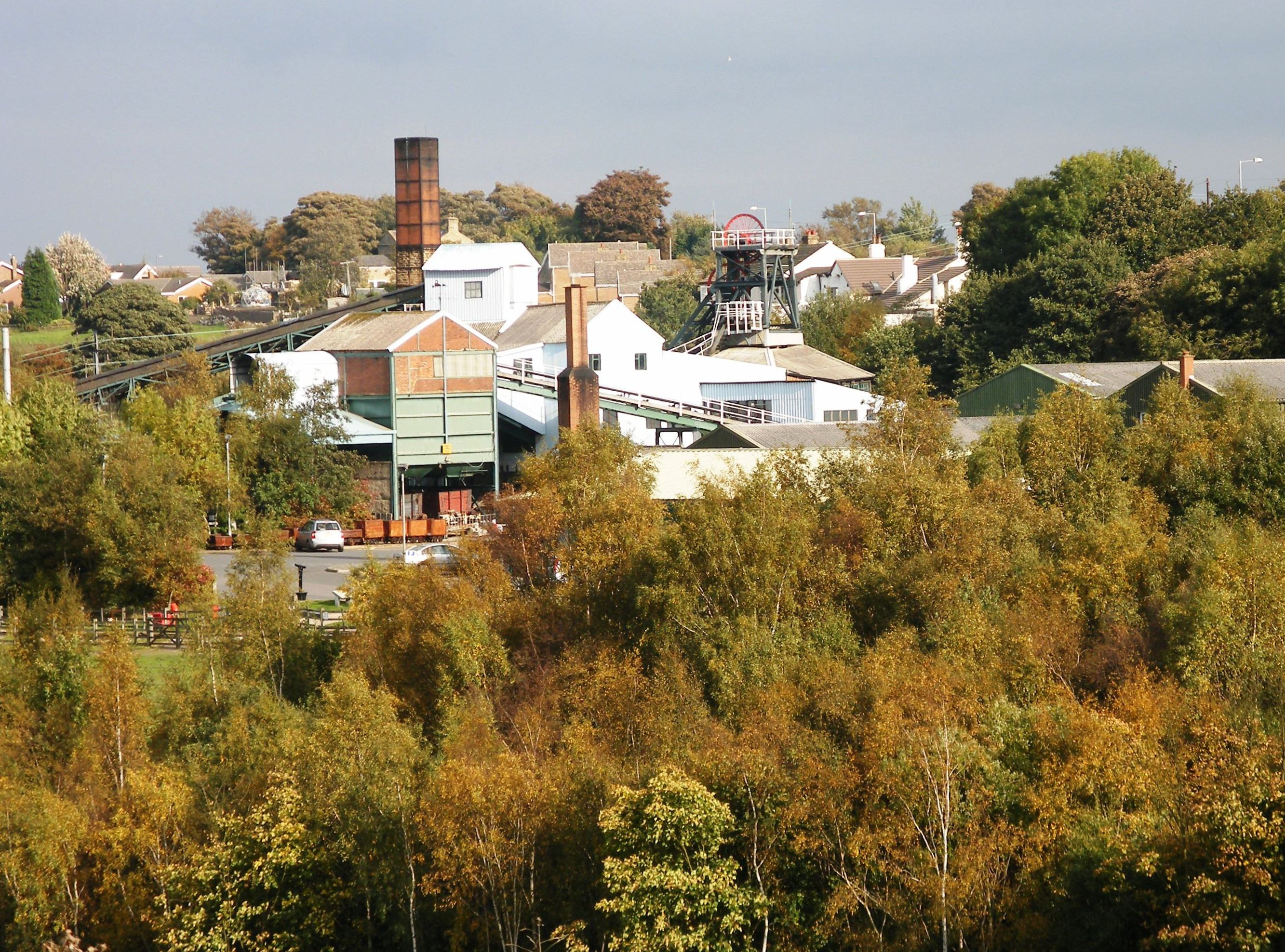
- Area
  - 1891: 3,412 acres (13.81 km^{2})
- Population
  - 1881: 2993
  - 1961: 3482
- History
  - Created: Middle Ages
- Status: Historic township Civil parish
  - Units: Middlestown, Netherton, Overton, Midgley

Sitlington, historically Shitlington, was a township in the ancient ecclesiastical parish of Thornhill in the wapentake of Agbrigg and Morley in the West Riding of Yorkshire comprising the villages and hamlets of Middlestown, Netherton, Overton and Midgley. The h was dropped from Shitlington and Sitlington was adopted in 1929 with the approval of the county council. The population of the civil parish at the 2011 census was 5,963.

== History ==
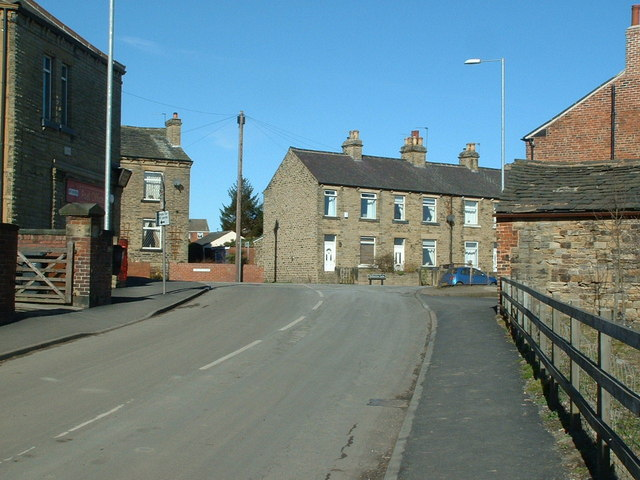
Street in Netherton

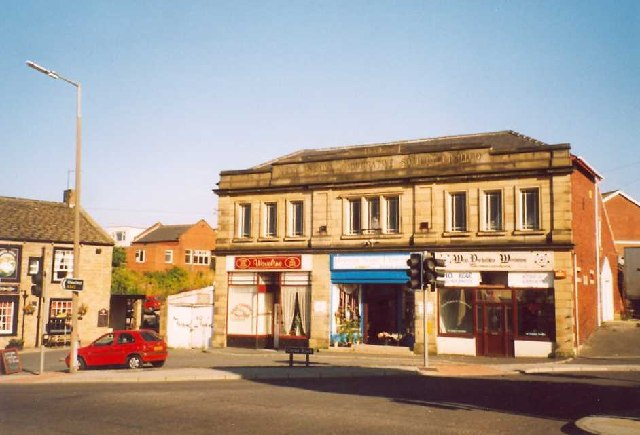
On the main street in Middlestown

=== Toponymy ===
Shitlington has Anglo-Saxon origins. It possibly began as the settlement, tun, connected with scyttel (either a personal name or a bar or gate which bolts shut) or might mean a farm or settlement on a steep slope. The village is recorded as "Schelingtone" in the Domesday Book. Other spellings have included Shytlington, Sittlington, Schetlinton, and Scyllinton.

Netherton was recorded as Schiteliton Inferior in the 13th century and subsequently as Nether Shitlington. It means the "lower town". Middlestown was Midelshitelington in the 14th century and a 15th-century document records it as Mydleston. Overton was recorded as Overshitlyngton in the 11th century. Midgley was Migelie in the 12th century and could mean either the "large pasture" or "midge infested clearing". Coxley, recorded as Cockesclo at the end of the 12th century, meant a "dell where there were cocks". Hollinhurst possibly means the "holly wood".

=== Medieval ===
Shitlington was part of the extensive Manor of Wakefield. At the Domesday survey its six oxgangs of land was described as waste. Within the township were three manors, Netherton, New Hall and Overton belonged to a family named Everingham. New Hall, once a moated manor house became the property of Sir Thomas Wortley and subsequently the Earls of Wharncliffe. Land changed hands frequently and the Armitages bought land in Middlestown and Overton in 1598.

=== Mining ===
In medieval times monks from Kirkstall, Rievaulx and Byland Abbeys and St John's Priory in Pontefract obtained ironstone from Sitlington. The seam of ironstone lay between the Joan and Flockton coal seams in the area. Ironstone was mined at Emroyd from 1798. A blast furnace powered by a steam engine built there closed around 1821. Emroyd was then exploited for its coal.

== Geography and geology ==
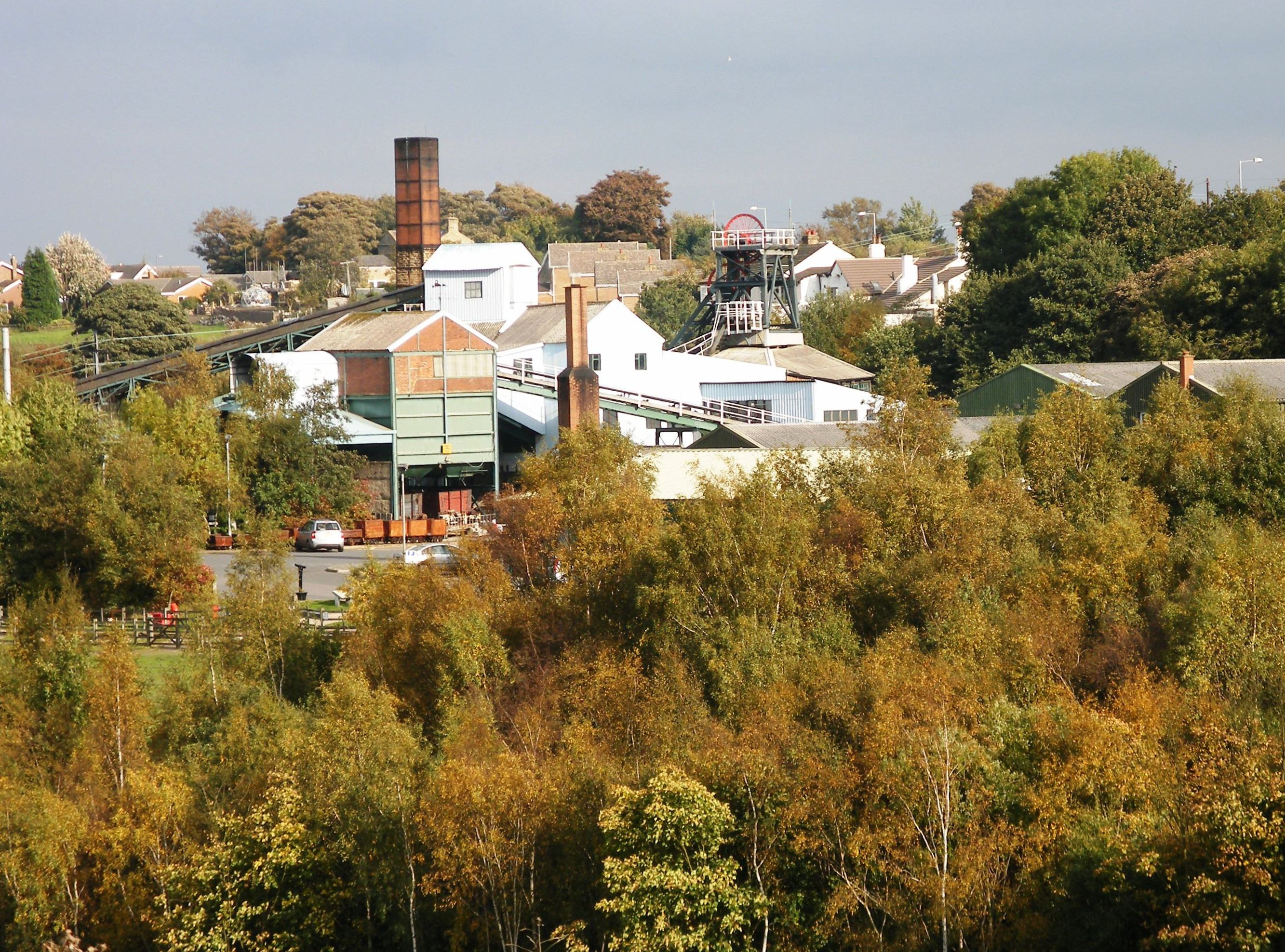
National Mining Museum at Caphouse Colliery

Sitlington covers 3412 acres in the valley of the River Calder. Netherton and Midgley are in the south-west of the township separated from Overton and Middlestown in the north east by the wooded valley of the Coxley Beck. The A642 road between Wakefield and Huddersfield passes through Middlestown and by the National Mining Museum at Caphouse Colliery in Overton. It has a junction with the B6117 at Horbury Bridge which passes through Netherton and Midgley.

The geology of the area comprises the Coal Measures of the South Yorkshire Coalfield, sandstone, Millstone Grit and in medieval times, ironstone was got from the Tankersley seam that outcrops in Overton and Emroyd Common in Middlestown. Opencast mining took place in 1975. Caphouse Colliery, in the west of the township, stopped produced coal in 1985 and instead became the National Coal Mining Museum for England. Denby Grange Colliery, mid-way between Netherton and Midgley, closed in 1991.

== See also ==
- Listed buildings in Sitlington
