= Flockton =

Village in West Yorkshire, England

Coordinates: 53.630°N 1.635°W

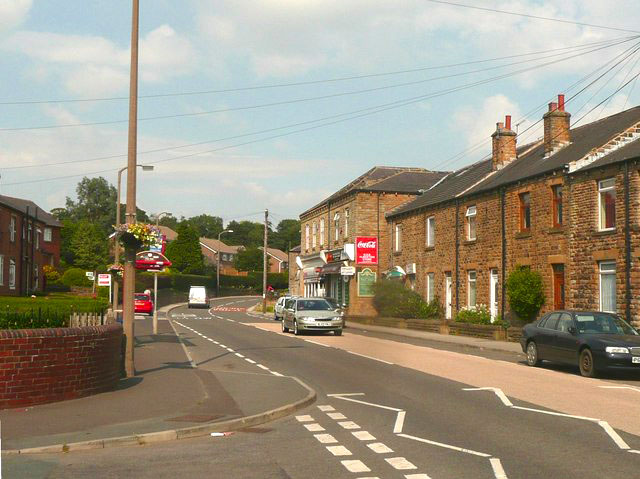
- Barnsley Road A637, Flockton

- Location within West Yorkshire
- Population: 2,107 (2020 Kirklees Council)
- OS grid reference: SE242149
  - London: 160 mi (260 km) SSE
- Civil parish: Kirkburton
- Metropolitan borough: Kirklees
- Metropolitan county: West Yorkshire
- Region: Yorkshire and the Humber
- Country: England
- Sovereign state: United Kingdom
- Post town: WAKEFIELD
- Postcode district: WF4
- Dialling code: 01924
- Police: West Yorkshire
- Fire: West Yorkshire
- Ambulance: Yorkshire
- UK Parliament: Dewsbury and Batley

Flockton is a village in the civil parish of Kirkburton, in Kirklees, West Yorkshire, England. It is halfway between Huddersfield and Wakefield. In 2020, the population of Flockton and Flockton Green was estimated to be 2,107.

Its name derives from Flóki, an Old Norse personal name, and tūn, which is Old English for enclosure or fence.

== History ==
Flockton grew in a coal mining area, Flockton Collieries are closed. Locals could find mining jobs at nearby collieries such as Bullhouse, Shuttle Eye, Emley Moor, or Caphouse Colliery when the local pits were closed due to their inability to compete pricewise with collieries that were connected to the railways.

== Governance ==
Flockton was formerly a chapelry in the parish of Thornhill in the West Riding of Yorkshire and from 1866 Flockton was a civil parish and in 1894 an urban district. In 1938 the urban district was abolished and Flockton was added to Kirkburton.

== Geography ==
Flockton contains the once separate areas of Over and Nether Flockton and Flockton Green. The village is about 6 miles (10 km) east of Huddersfield and the same distance south-west of Wakefield. The village extends along the A637 Grange Moor to Barnsley road. At Flockton Green, at the eastern end of the village, there is a junction with the road from Overton. To the west is Flockton Moor, a rural area containing mainly farmhouses. Parkside is an area of council housing. In contrast there are stone-built private developments. House prices are above average for the area. Flockton is a commuter village because of its proximity to the M1 motorway, which brings with it a large amount of traffic.

It had a population of 800 in 1809. At the 1951 census (the last before the abolition of the parish), Flockton had a population of 1,318.

== Amenities ==
St James the Great Church is on Barnsley Road next to Flockton C of E (C) First School.

Flockton has a newsagent/convenience store, a working men's club, and a motorcycle shop. There used to be a hairdressing salon and a fish and chips shop, however both have closed. The Dartmouth Arms public house was replaced by an Indian restaurant in October 2007 and has also since closed. The George and Dragon at Flockton Green is one of the oldest public houses in England, dating from 1485. This is now The Arc. The other pub in the village is The Sun.

== New Hall Prison ==
New Hall Prison is in New Hall Wood, 0.6 miles (1 km) east of Flockton. The prison holds female adults, juveniles and young offenders.

== Sport ==
Flockton has a cricket team that plays in the Huddersfield Cricket League. The village football teams play in Huddersfield and District Association Football League leagues.

== See also ==
- Listed buildings in Kirkburton
