= Listed buildings in Sitlington =

Sitlington is a civil parish in the metropolitan borough of the City of Wakefield, West Yorkshire, England. The parish contains ten listed buildings that are recorded in the National Heritage List for England. Of these, two are listed at Grade II*, the middle of the three grades, and the others are at Grade II, the lowest grade. The parish contains the villages of Middlestown, Netherton, and Overton, and the surrounding countryside. In the parish is the large house, Netherton Hall, which is listed together with associated structures. Also in the parish is the former Caphouse Colliery, later the National Coal Mining Museum for England, which contains two listed buildings. The other listed buildings consist of farm buildings, a wagonway tunnel and its portal, a row of cottages, a milepost, and a church.

== Key ==
| Grade | Criteria |
|---|---|
| II* | Particularly important buildings of more than special interest |
| II | Buildings of national importance and special interest |

== Buildings ==
| Name and location | Photograph | Date | Notes | Grade |
|---|---|---|---|---|
| Barn, Hollinhirst Farm; 53.64430°N 1.56734°W | — | 16th century (probable) | The barn to the southeast of the farmhouse is timber framed, it was encased in stone in the 18th century, and has a stone slate roof. There are five internal bays and narrow aisles, and the barn contains a central square-headed cart entry with a quoined surround. | II |
| Flockton waggonway tunnel and entrance portal 53.63836°N 1.61521°W | — | 1772–75 | The tunnel contained a wooden wagonway, and has stone walls and a vaulted tunnel that extends for about 50 metres (160 ft) and is then blocked. The portal was rebuilt in about 1986. | II |
| Netherton Hall; 53.64849°N 1.57686°W | — | c. 1775 | A large stone house with sill bands, a moulded eaves cornice, and a stone slate roof, partly tiled. There are three storeys, a double-depth plan, three bays with a full-width pediment, and flanking wings with two storeys and one bay. The middle bay contains a recessed arch with a quatrefoil in the tympanum of the pediment. The central doorway has an architrave, a fanlight, and a triangular pediment. In the outer bays are two-storey canted bay windows, and a Diocletian window in the top floor. At the rear is a tall round-arched stair window. | II* |
| Summer house, Netherton Hall; 53.64826°N 1.57725°W | — | c. 1775 | The summer house is in stone, with quoins, a sill band, an impost band, a moulded eaves cornice, and a hipped stone slate roof. There is a single storey, and a symmetrical front of three bays, the middle bay projecting under a pediment. In the centre is a round-headed doorway flanked by small windows. In the outer bays are windows, that in the right bay converted into a doorway. | II |
| Farm buildings, Netherton Hall Farm; 53.64767°N 1.57729°W | — | c. 1775 | The farm buildings are in stone with quoins, and stone slate roofs, and form a rectangle around a courtyard. There is a symmetrical front of seven bays, the middle bay projecting under a pediment, and side ranges of five bays. It has a floor band, and a moulded eaves cornice. In the centre is a cart entry with a segmental arch and a quoined surround, and above it is a plaque. | II |
| 60, 60A, 62 and 64 New Road, Middlestown; 53.65133°N 1.59691°W | — | Early to mid 19th century | A row of five, later four, cottages in stone with a stone slate roof. There are two storeys and each cottage has one bay. The windows are either mullioned, or have a single light. | II |
| Milepost; 53.65096°N 1.59715°W | | Mid to late 19th century | The milepost is on the southeast side of New Road (A642 road). It is in stone with cast iron overlay, and has a triangular section and a rounded top. On the top is inscribed "WAKEFIELD & AUSTERLANDS ROAD" and "MIDDLESTOWN", and on the sides are the distances to Huddersfield, Horbury, and Wakefield. | II |
| Chimney and boiler house, Caphouse Colliery; 53.64425°N 1.61794°W | | c. 1876 (probable) | The chimney at the former colliery, later a museum, is in stone with a later upper brick section; the lower part tapers, and the upper part is straight-sided and is supported by iron straps. The boiler house is later and in brick, with an asbestos roof. It is on two levels, and contains two Lancashire boilers encased in brick. | II |
| Winding house, heapstead and headstock, Caphouse Colliery; 53.64402°N 1.61824°W | | 1876 | The buildings are in a former colliery, later a museum. The winding house is in stone with a stone slate roof, and contains a twin cylinder steam winding engine. The heapstead has a stone base, with brick in the upper part, reinforcement in concrete and steel, and an asbestos roof, and the headstock is wooden with later steelwork, and has cast iron spoked winding wheels. | II* |
| St Andrew's Church, Netherton; 53.64902°N 1.57398°W | | 1880–81 | The church was designed by J. D. Sedding. It is in stone with a tile roof, and consists of nave and chancel in one unit, with a south porch and vestry. At the west end is a projection containing a baptistry, flanked by buttresses that rise to carry a bellcote. | II |
