= Alan Robert Webster =

Alan Robert Webster (born 1965 in Hatfield, Hertfordshire) is a high-profile English prisoner who pleaded guilty to several counts of rape against a 12-week-old baby girl, and making indecent images in January 2006. The girl was being babysat by his girlfriend Tanya Louise French (born 1986 in Wolverhampton), who also pleaded guilty to charges related to the attack. Webster also pleaded guilty to the rape of a 14-year-old girl and possession of child pornography.

He was sentenced to life imprisonment with a minimum term of six years. This was increased to eight years by the Court of Appeal on 8 June 2006. Lord Chief Justice, Lord Phillips stated in his ruling that he questioned if the Parole Board should ever consider Webster's release considering the "depravity" of the crime. French was jailed for five years at HM Prison New Hall, Flockton, West Yorkshire, and has since been released. Judge Findlay Baker said of the case "There are no words to express the abhorrence such offending generates".
