= Margaret Faull =

Australian archaeologist and museum director

- Born: 4 April 1946 (age 80)

Academic background
- Education: University of Leeds; University of Sheffield
- Thesis: British survival in Anglo-Saxon Yorkshire (1979)

Academic work
- Discipline: Archaeology; Museum studies
- Sub-discipline: Early medieval England; Anglo-Saxon archaeology; Industrial archaeology
- Institutions: Thwaite Mills Industrial Museum; National Coal Mining Museum for England

Margaret Lindsay Faull, OBE, FSA (born 4 April 1946) is an Australian-British archaeologist and museum director, noted for her work on Anglo-Saxon England and industrial archaeology.

== Biography ==
Faull was born on 4 April 1946 and grew up in Sydney. She undertook a Doctor of Philosophy (PhD) degree in the Department of Archaeology, University of Leeds. Her doctoral thesis was titled "British survival in Anglo-Saxon Yorkshire" and was completed in 1979.

Faull worked as an archaeologist for what was at the time the West Yorkshire Metropolitan County Council, followed by employment at Thwaite Mills Industrial Museum in Leeds. In 1986, she supported the banning of South African archaeologists from the World Archaeological Congress as part of the Academic boycott of South Africa in opposition to apartheid.

She became director of the Yorkshire Mining Museum in Wakefield in 1986 or 1987. She completed a Master of Arts (MA) degree at the University of Sheffield in 1990, with a thesis titled "The Use by Local Authorities of the Charitable Trust as a Vehicle for Establishing and Operating Museums. Two Case Studies: Caphouse Colliery and Thwaite Mills". The Yorkshire Mining Museum became the National Coal Mining Museum for England in 1995. She retired from her role as director in October 2015.

She was elected a Fellow of the Society of Antiquaries of London (FSA) on 4 April 2005. In the 2009 Queen's Birthday Honours, she was appointed an Officer of the Order of the British Empire (OBE) "for services to industrial heritage", particularly due to her work at the Coal Mining Museum.

== Publications ==
=== Early medieval England ===
- 'Britons and Angles in Yorkshire', Studium: The Journal of the Sydnry Medieval & Renaissance Group, 6 (1974), pp. 1–24
- 'Roman and Anglian Settlement Patterns in Yorkshire', Northern History, 9 (1974), 1–25, doi:10.1179/nhi.1974.9.1.1
- 'The Semantic Development of Old English Wealh', Leeds Studies in English, n.s., 8 (1975), 20–44
- 'The Location and Relationship of the Sancton Anglo-Saxon Cemeteries', The Antiquaries Journal, 56 (1976), 227–33, doi:10.1017/S0003581500064702
- 'British Survival in Anglo-Saxon Northumbria', in Studies in Celtic Survival, ed. by L. Laing, British Archaeological Reports, British Series, 37 (Oxford: BAR, 1977), pp. 1–55.
- 'Place-Names and Past Landscapes', Journal of the English Place-Name Society, 11 (1978–79), 24–46
- 'The Use of Place-Names in Reconstructing the Historic Landscape, Illustrated by Names from Adel Township', Landscape History, 1 (1979), 34–43, doi:10.1080/01433768.1979.10594338
- and Richard T. Smith, 'Phosphate Analysis and Three Possible Dark Age Ecclesiastical Sites in Yorkshire', Landscape History, 2 (1980), 21–38, doi:10.1080/01433768.1980.10594344
- 'The Pre-Conquest Ecclesiastical Pattern', in West Yorkshire: An Archaeological Survey to A.D. 1500, ed. by M. L. Faull and S. A. Moorhouse, 4 vols (Wakefield: West Yorkshire Metropolitan County Council, 1981), pp. 210–23 ISBN 0861810015
- 'Roman and Anglo-Saxon Settlement Patterns in Yorkshire: A Computer-Generated Analysis', Landscape History, 5 (1983), 21–40, doi:10.1080/01433768.1983.10594370
- 'Late Anglo-Saxon Settlement Patterns in Yorkshire', in Studies in Late Anglo-Saxon Settlement, ed. by M. L. Faull (Oxford, 1984), pp. 129–42
- 'Settlement and Society in North East England in the Fifth Century', in Settlement and Society in the Roman North, ed. by P. R. Wilson, R. F. J. Jones and D. M. Evans (Bradford: University of Bradford, 1984), pp. 49–56
- Domesday Book: Yorkshire, ed. by M. L. Faull and Marie Stinson, Domesday Book: A Survey of the Counties of England, 30 (Chichester: Phillimore, 1986), ISBN 9780850335316
- 'The Decoration of the South Doorway of Ledsham Church Tower', Journal of the British Archaeological Association, 139 (1986), 143–47, doi:10.1179/jba.1986.139.1.143

=== Museum studies ===
- 'The Conversion of Thwaite Mills and Caphouse Colliery into Working Industrial Museums to Demonstrate the Impact of the Development of Technology on Society', in The History of Technology, Science and Society, 1750-1914, ed. by R. Schofield (Belfast, 1988), pp. 1–32
- 'National Coal Mining Museums: Fossilised Monuments or Leaders of our Future?', Mining History: The Bulletin of the Peak District Mines Historical Society, 17. 4 (winter 2009), 100–8.
- 'Coal Mining, the Yorkshire Landscape and the Yorkshire Mining Museum', Society for Landscape Studies Newsletter (summer 1991), 3–7
- 'Case Study: Thwaite Mills, Leeds', in A New Head of Steam: Industrial History in the Museum, ed. by R. Clark (Edinburgh, 1992), pp. 29–30
- and L. Orme, 'The National Coal Mining Museum for England: The Preservation of the Coal-Mining Landscape', Society for Landscape Studies Newsletter (autumn/winter 2003), 9–10
- 'Coal Mining and the Landscape of England, 1700 to the Present Day', Landscape History, 30 (2008), 59–74, doi:10.1080/01433768.2008.10594600
- 'Culture, the Arts and Entrepreneurship and the Industrial Heritage of West Yorkshire', in Kultura, Sztuka i Przedsiębiorczośćw przestrzeni przemysłowej: XII Międzynarodowa Konferencja Turystyki Dziedzictwa Przemysłowego Zabrze, 21–22. 05. 2015 r/Culture, Art, Entrepreneurship in the Space of Industrial Heritage: 12th International Conference on Industrial Heritage and Tourism (Zabrze: Urząd Miejski w Zabrzu, 2015), pp. 134–67

=== Australian history ===
- 'Indigenous Australian Land management before the European Settlement in 1788: A Review Article', Landscape History, 35 (2014), 67–79, doi:10.1080/01433768.2014.981396
