= HM Prison New Hall =

Prison in Wakefield, West Yorkshire, England

Coordinates: 53.6358°N 1.6118°W

HMP New Hall
- Interactive map of HMP New Hall
- Location: Dial Wood, Flockton, West Yorkshire
- Security class: Female/Closed Category
- Capacity: 376
- Population: 317 (July 2026)
- Managed by: HM Prison Services
- Governor: Jennifer Willis
- Website: New Hall at justice.gov.uk

HMP New Hall is a closed-category prison for female adults, juveniles, and young offenders. The prison is located in the village of Flockton (near Wakefield) in West Yorkshire, England. New Hall is operated by His Majesty's Prison Service.

== History ==
In 1933, New Hall became the first prison to implement the then-experimental Open Prison system. This was seen as a potential method for dealing with the combined problems of the rising numbers of prisoners and the lack of proper employment for them. At first, the prison was populated by prisoners from HMP Wakefield who were soon due to be released, but in 1961 the prison became a Senior Detention Centre for male young offenders. It was during this time that, on some occasions, the 'short, sharp shock' regime was introduced. In 1987, the prison was assigned to serve a different population, and it was re-designated for a second time to become a women's prison.

In 1999, the BBC programme Jailbirds was filmed at New Hall, with director Chris Terrill being given unlimited access to the prison officers and inmates for a period of eight months.

== 21st century ==
New Hall is a closed female local prison which holds all categories of adult female prisoners. Aside from this, it caters to young offenders and juveniles who are on Detention and Training Orders. Accommodation at the prison is mainly in cells. There is a mother & baby unit, a health care centre, segregation unit, and some dormitories.

This prison provides full- and part-time education courses for prisoners in areas such as business administration, food hygiene, literacy, numeracy, information technology, NVQ Hairdressing, BTEC, and art. New Hall has workshops where inmates can gain experience in assembly work, light textile work, catering, and gardening. Employment and careers advice by Jobcentre Plus is also available. The prison's governor is Julia Spence. The Ministry of Justice has received planning permission to install solar panels at the site in a bid to reduce the prison's carbon footprint.

== Notable inmates ==
Notable people held at the prison include:

- Sarah Barrass, mother who in 2019 murdered two of her children and attempted to murder four others by poisoning and strangulation
- Aimee Betro, American woman convicted of conspiracy to murder.
- Alice Cutter, member of the terrorist group National Action, released in 2022
- Tanya French, convicted of raping a 12 week old baby. (since released)
- Lucy Letby, neonatal nurse convicted of the murder of numerous infants in her care. (Moved to HMP Bronzefield in January 2024)
- Frankie Smith, mother who allowed the death of her child Star Hobson in 2020, who was murdered by her partner Savannah Brockhill
- Katrina Walsh, killer
- Rose West, serial killer
- Karen White, rapist who later transitioned, was placed in New Hall and sexually assaulted female inmates
