= Karen White case =

Controversial imprisonment of transgender woman

In October 2018, Karen White, a trans woman from Manchester, England, was convicted for committing two rapes, wounding her neighbour in a knife attack, and two sexual assaults she committed against fellow inmates while on remand in a women's prison.

White was initially arrested in August 2017 for a knife attack against her elderly neighbour and remanded to HM Prison New Hall. While imprisoned there, she was accused of multiple instances of sexual assault against female inmates within a three month period. Officials also became aware of two rapes she committed in 2003 and 2016. She was subsequently moved to HM Prison Leeds, a men's prison, while police investigated.

White's imprisonment alongside other women drew controversy, and led to a change in government policy on housing transgender prisoners. According to criminologist Dr Sarah Lamble, the case received particular media attention due to increasing anti-trans rhetoric in the UK and abroad.

== Timeline ==
White was born in 1965 or 1966. Prior to 2017, she had been convicted of indecent assault; indecent exposure and gross indecency involving children; violence and dishonesty.

In August 2017, White was arrested for a knife attack on a 66-year-old neighbour in Mytholmroyd. She was remanded to HM Prison New Hall.

While imprisoned at New Hall, multiple complaints of sexual assault were made against White. In one instance, she pressed her erect penis against the back of another inmate while queuing for medication. In another, White grabbed another inmate's hand and pressed it against her breast prosthesis. She was subsequently relocated to HM Prison Leeds, a men's prison, while police investigated.

Officials became aware of rape charges after White wrote to a woman she had dated after meeting in a West Yorkshire psychiatric hospital. The woman reported that White had violently raped her multiple times during their relationship in 2016. A second woman accused White of raping her in Manchester in 2003 after spiking her drink with alcohol; White was arrested at the time, but ultimately not prosecuted.

== Trial ==
White's trial was held at Leeds Crown Court in October 2018. The prosecutor Christopher Dunn cast doubt on her identity, calling her "allegedly a transgender female" because there were "smatterings of evidence... that the defendant's approach to transitioning has been less than committed", and suggested that she used "a transgender persona" to put herself in contact with vulnerable victims.

White pleaded guilty to two counts of rape, one count of wounding, and two sexual assaults. Judge Christopher Batty sentenced her to life, with a minimum 9½ years before parole could be considered. In his sentencing, he said of White, "You are a predator and highly manipulative and in my view you are a danger. You represent a significant risk of serious harm to children, to women and to the general public."

== Aftermath and impact ==
In February 2019, the Karen White case was raised in British Parliament in an oral question. Edward Argar, Parliamentary Under-Secretary of State for Justice, answered to explain that as a result of the case, the government was reviewing policy on transgender inmates and its application. Thereafter, the Ministry of Justice created a special unit for transgender inmates. A spokesperson said, "Prisoner safety is our biggest concern and any decisions we take will seek to best manage the risks posed by each offender. The wider management of transgender offenders is a highly sensitive issue which poses unique and complex challenges... That's why we are reviewing the way we manage all transgender offenders."

White's case has been the subject of academic and political commentary. Dr Sarah Lamble, Reader in Criminology and Queer Theory at Birkbeck, University of London, has argued that the White case received particular media attention owing to its part in wider anti-transgender discourse.

New policy guidance for England and Wales came into force on 27 February 2023, under which transgender women offenders would no longer be housed in women’s prisons if they had "male genitalia" or had committed sex crimes, without explicit approval.

In 2023, White wrote a letter saying trans women should be kept out of female prisons.
