= Shuttle Eye Colliery =

Former coal mine in Yorkshire, England

Coordinates: 53.636°N 1.666°W

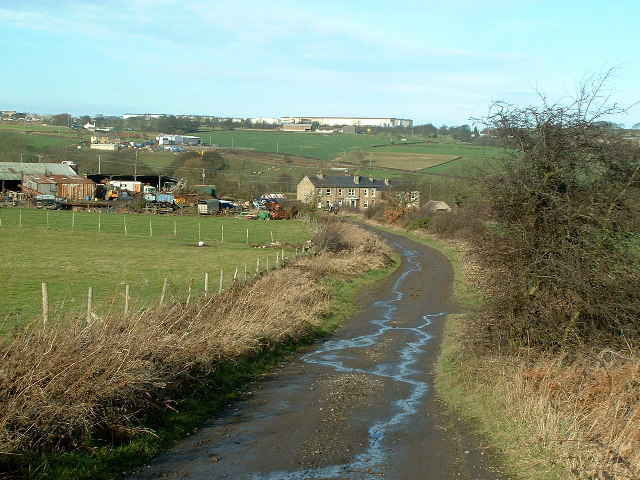
View towards the warehouses on the site of the former colliery (2006)

Shuttle Eye Colliery was a coal mine on the West Yorkshire Coalfield at Grange Moor between Wakefield and Huddersfield on the A642 road, in England.

The colliery was started in 1862 by Lockwood and Elliott and had two shafts, the deepest 288 yards. It produced coal from the Beeston and Black Bed seams. Two drift mines at Gregory Spring in Hopton near Mirfield to the north were linked to Shuttle Eye in 1962. The colliery was nationalised in 1947. It closed in 1973.

In 1896 the colliery had 86 underground workers and 13 on the surface. By 1923 the workforce numbered 179 and 175 ten years later. At nationalisation the colliery had 234 underground and 40 surface workers. The colliery employed 222 workers in the 1970s.

After the closure of the colliery, the site has been overbuilt with warehouses.
