= Alec Skelding =

English cricketer and umpire (1886–1960)

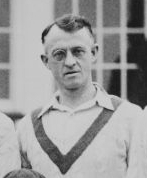
- Skelding in 1930

Personal information
- Born: 5 September 1886; Leicester, England
- Died: 18 April 1960 (aged 73); Westcotes, Leicester, England
- Batting: Right-handed
- Bowling: Right-arm fast

Career statistics
| Competition | First-class |
|---|---|
| Matches | 177 |
| Runs scored | 1,117 |
| Batting average | 6.76 |
| 100s/50s | 0/0 |
| Top score | 33 |
| Balls bowled | 29,349 |
| Wickets | 593 |
| Bowling average | 24.67 |
| 5 wickets in innings | 35 |
| 10 wickets in match | 4 |
| Best bowling | 8/44 |
| Catches/stumpings | 48/– |
- Source: CricketArchive, 8 November 2022

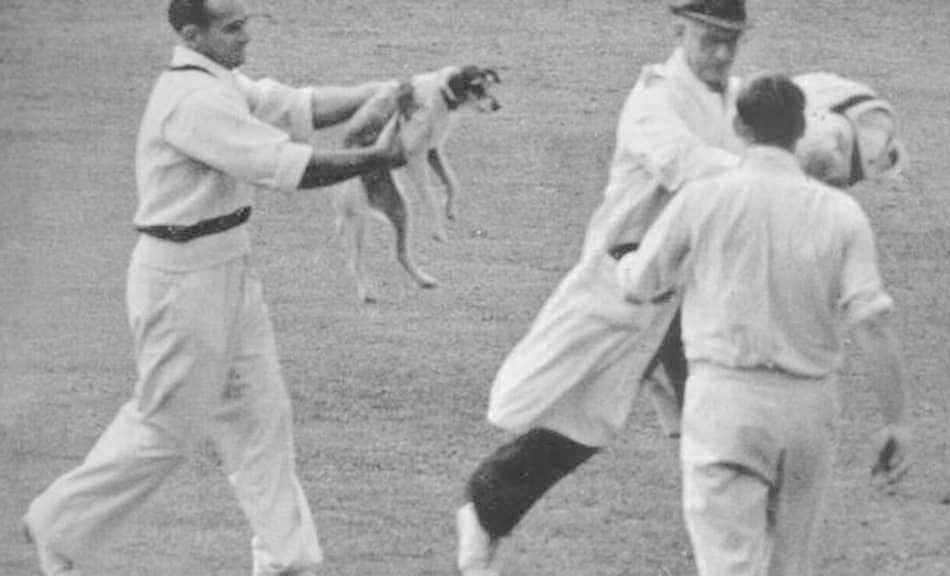
Barnes chasing Skelding with the dog at The Oval

Alexander Skelding (5 September 1886 – 18 April 1960) was a first-class cricketer and umpire.

== The fast bowler ==
After playing for local clubs, he joined the Leicestershire County Cricket Club ground staff as a fast bowler in 1905 but, because he wore spectacles, was not re-engaged at the end of the season. He then joined Kidderminster in the Birmingham League and achieved success, in 1912 the county re-signed him and he continued with them until he retired in 1929. He made his debut in county cricket in 1912, and played fairly regularly in the two seasons before the first world war. It was in the middle and late 1920s, however, when he was around his 40th year and past the retirement age of most bowlers of his pace, that he showed remarkable skill as a fast bowler. He was at times considered the fastest bowler in the country.

His best season was 1927 – his benefit year – when he took 102 wickets, at an average of 20.81. His most outstanding performance was to dismiss eight Nottinghamshire batsmen for 44 runs on a flat batting track at Grace Road in 1924. He played 177 matches in all, taking 593 wickets at just 24.67. He claimed five wickets in an innings 35 times and ten wickets in a match on ten occasions. He was not a batsman, however, scoring 1117 runs at 6.76 with a top score of 33. He took 48 catches. His visual impairment during his career was a consistent issue. Asked in his playing days if he found spectacles a handicap, Alec said: 'The specs are for the look of the thing. I can't see without'em and on hot days I can't see with'em, because they get steamed up. So I bowl on hearing only and appeal twice an over.'

== The umpire ==
Like most renowned umpires he was reluctant to give decisions unless absolutely convinced of the appeal. Once in response to an appeal for run out, he stated: 'That was a "photo-finish" and as there isn't time to develop the plate, I shall say not out.' In one celebrated brush with combative Australian and Somerset County Cricket Club stalwart Bill Alley, the following exchange ensued after Skelding had turned down a close appeal for LBW. Alley: "Sorry Alex, I suppose it would not have hit off stump". Skelding: "You’re right, Bill." Alley: "And, I suppose it would not have hit leg-stump either." Skelding: "You’re right again, Bill." Alley "But it'd have definitely hit bloody middle!"

Despite this, he famously officiated over the first all LBW hat trick in cricket, taken by Horace Fisher, the Yorkshire slow left-armer against Somerset County Cricket Club at Bramall Lane in 1932. After giving Mitchell-Innes and Andrews out lbw, he stared up the wicket at batsman Luckes when the third appeal was made, and finally-almost in disbelief-announced, "As God's my witness, that's out, too." and lifted his finger. "I was never more sure that I was right in each case," he said afterwards, and each of the batsmen agreed that he had been trapped dead in front.

His wit on the field saw him held in great affection, but his reputation was still underpinned by respect, as he was one of the most accomplished umpires of his day. In one match a batsman who had been celebrating a special event the previous evening was rapped on the pad by a ball. At once the bowler asked: "How is he?" Said Alec, shaking his head sadly: "He's not at all well, and he was even worse last night." Occasionally the joke went against Alec. In a game in 1948 he turned down a strong appeal by the Australian touring team. A little later a dog ran onto the field, and Sid Barnes captured it, carried it to Skelding and said: 'Here you are. All you want now is a white stick!'

Alec Skelding stood in 536 first-class games. His first game as umpire began on 9 May 1931 at New Road when he oversaw, Worcestershire County Cricket Club v Northamptonshire County Cricket Club. His final game in the white coat came when Leicestershire, appropriately enough, entertained Ireland at Grace Road. Of his contemporaries, only Frank Chester stood in more first-class games with 774, though David Constant has since eclipsed Skelding in second place. On 14 August 1959, for the very last time, he removed the bails with a theatrical flourish and announced, as he always did, 'And that concludes the entertainment for the day, gentlemen.'
