= Aimee Betro =

American disc golfer and criminal (born 1979)

Aimee Jean Betro (born 27 August 1979) is a former American disc golfer, and criminal, convicted in the United Kingdom of attempting to carry out the contract killing of a shopkeeper in Birmingham in September 2019. After striking up an online relationship with one of her co-conspirators, Betro travelled from the US to the UK in August 2019, and disguised herself in a niqab in order to carry out the assassination. She attempted to shoot Sikander Ali at point-blank range, but her gun jammed, allowing him to escape. On a later occasion, Betro fired shots into Ali's family home before fleeing back to the United States. She then travelled to Armenia, where she was arrested in 2024, and extradited to the UK. Following a trial at Birmingham Crown Court, Betro was convicted on 12 August 2025, and later sentenced to 30 years in prison.

== Background ==
Aimee Jean Betro was born on 27 August 1979, and raised in Stevens Point, Wisconsin, where she attended Stevens Point Area Senior High School, graduating in 1996. Her stepfather has described her as a "good girl", who "always went to school [and] got pretty good grades". She played competitive disc golf, and between 2001 and 2016, took part in 29 tournaments, eight of which she won. In 2003, she wrote a letter to her local newspaper expressing her support for free birth control for women. She studied graphic design and early childhood education at Wisconsin's Mid-State Technical College, and after completing her studies in 2005, held a series of low-level jobs. She left Stevens Point in 2013, severing contact with her family, and was subsequently employed as an administrator by the Milwaukee Brewers Major League Baseball team. In 2018, she struck up an online relationship with Mohammed Nazir, who resided in the English city of Derby, after meeting him via a dating app, and travelled from her home in West Allis, Wisconsin, to Manchester to meet Nazir in December 2018. They spent Christmas together, before she flew back to the United States in January 2019. She also visited the UK for two weeks in May 2019, although she did not meet up with Nazir on that occasion. She would later claim that the purpose of this trip was to stay with a friend in Birmingham, and at "someone's house in the middle of England to take care of their dog".

Her involvement in conspiracy to murder occurred after a revenge plot was orchestrated by Nazir, and his father, Mohammed Aslam, following a violent dispute over the price of a wedding suit at Seher Boutique, a clothing store in Birmingham belonging to Aslat Mahumad. Aslam and Nazir both sustained serious injuries during the altercation, which occurred in July 2018, with Aslam receiving brain injuries that had a long term impact on his cognitive function. Following the incident at the shop, windows were smashed at Aslam and Nazir's home later the same day. The pair subsequently hatched the plot to kill either Mahumad, or a member of his family, in retribution. It is unclear why Betro became embroiled in the plot, but in his sentencing statement, Simon Drew KC, the judge who presided over her trial, suggested that it "appears [she was] acting out of infatuation or love" for Nazir.

== Attempted shooting ==
Posing as a tourist, Betro returned to the UK on 22 August 2019, landing at Manchester Airport. In the following days she posted pictures of a number of UK landmarks on social media, and documented her activities while staying at various hotels in London, Birmingham and Manchester. Among these were attending the Tranzmission Festival at Crystal Palace, taking a boat tour of the River Thames, and travelling to Manchester to visit what she described as her "partner in crime". She also rented a Mercedes car, which was involved in a collision with two other vehicles in a suspected £12,000 "crash for cash" insurance scam involving Nazir.

On 4 September she travelled to Derby, where she met Nazir. On the same day, the handgun she intended to use was test fired on waste land. Having booked herself into the Rotunda Hotel in Birmingham, she bought two burner phones, one of which she gave to Nazir. She initially contacted Mahumad on 6 September under the pretence of wanting to buy a VW Golf he had advertised for sale on Gumtree. He declined to meet her, because he had not posted his telephone number online, and instead offered to send someone else to show her the car. On the morning of 7 September, she left her hotel and bought a second hand Mercedes E240 from a garage in Alum Rock, using the name Becky Booth, then travelled to the Yardley area of Birmingham, where she lay in wait outside Mahumad's property. At 8.10pm, Mahumad's son, Sikander Ali, arrived at the house in his SUV. As he exited his car on the property's drive, Betro, disguised in a niqab, approached him, produced the gun and fired. However, the gun jammed and Ali was able to escape by getting back into his vehicle and reversing at high speed, damaging the driver's door of Betro's car in the process. Betro then drove away, and abandoned the Mercedes nearby. Sikander alerted his family about the incident, and they found the empty car following a search of the area. After changing her clothes, Betro returned to the area in a taxi during the early hours of the following morning. Instructing the taxi driver to park some distance from Mahumad's property, she walked to the house and fired a number of shots through its front windows. The property was empty at the time.

Betro returned to the United States on 9 September, and Nazir joined her there three days later. Betro would later testify that she and Nazir rented a car "just for a road trip", visiting locations including Seattle, Area 51 in Nevada, Los Angeles and San Francisco. The pair also devised a plot to frame a former associate of Nazir's, a man with whom he had once cultivated cannabis. This would involve mailing ammunition and gun parts to him from the United States, then tipping off the police. Nazir returned to the UK on 13 October, where he was later arrested.

== Investigation and arrest ==
Police became aware of Betro following the attempt to frame Nazir's former associate. West Midlands Police launched an investigation into the incident, and Betro's movements were tracked using CCTV footage and mobile phone data. A video of a handgun being test fired was found on Nazir's phone, with the date on the footage, 4 September 2019, coinciding with Betro's visit to Derby to meet Nazir. CCTV footage was found showing Betro wearing a distinctive summer dress as she left her hotel on the morning of 7 September, and of her purchasing the car. Footage was also obtained showing the Mercedes repeatedly driving past Mahumad's property, along with a red Volvo belonging to Aslam and Nazir. Police also discovered that Betro had purchased burner phones during shopping trips as she planned the shooting. Her DNA was also found on the contents of three packages she posted to the UK, as well as on a black glove discovered inside the abandoned Mercedes.

The investigation and subsequent hunt for Betro, as well as efforts to extradite her, required the collaboration of several police forces, including West Midlands Police, Derbyshire Constabulary and the Federal Bureau of Investigation in the United States. A June 2024 Independent report suggested that extraditing her from the United States could be difficult, because the UK would need to provide evidence of a "reasonable" demonstration of guilt under both US law and UK law to request her extradition. However, Betro was not in the United States, but had travelled to Armenia in 2021. During her time there, she had continued to post pictures and have conversations with friends on social media platforms such as Snapchat and Instagram. She was eventually located in Armenia following a two-day investigation by journalists from the Daily Mail newspaper, who analysed background details in pictures she was posting on social media to pinpoint her whereabouts. The Mail then passed the information they had gathered to West Midlands Police, who began proceedings to extradite her.

The UK issued an international arrest request for Betro in June 2024. On 2 July, she was detained by Armenian Police at her rented apartment in a housing complex in Proshyan, a village on the outskirts of Yerevan, Armenia's capital city. She was extradited to the United Kingdom in January 2025, arriving at Gatwick Airport on 16 January, accompanied by officers from the National Crime Agency's specialist National Extradition Unit. On the same day, the Crown Prosecution Service authorised West Midlands Police to charge Betro with conspiracy to murder, possession of a firearm and fraudulently importing prohibited goods into the UK. Betro was transported to Birmingham, where she was charged. On 17 January, she appeared before Birmingham Magistrates' Court, where she was remanded in custody. On 14 February she entered a plea of not guilty during a hearing at Birmingham Crown Court, where she appeared via videolink from HMP New Hall. A trial date was also set for July.

== Trial and sentence ==
Nazir and Aslam went on trial for their part in the murder conspiracy in May 2024, and were convicted in June. Ali, who was arrested in January 2023 for an unrelated crime, did not give evidence at their trial, but gave a statement to police describing the night of the shooting. Both Nazir and Aslam were convicted of conspiracy to murder, while Nazir was additionally convicted of possession of a firearm with intent to cause fear of violence, perverting the course of justice and illegally importing firearms into the UK. They were sentenced to prison terms of 32 years and 10 years respectively at a hearing on 7 November 2024. In August 2024, Ali was sentenced to 13 years and six months in prison after pleading guilty to conspiracy to supply £560,000 worth of cocaine and transferring a firearm, which he had borrowed from a contact using the encrypted EncroChat messaging service.

Betro's trial was scheduled to take place at Birmingham Crown Court, but before it could begin, the court was required to address aspects of her welfare during the three-week proceedings. With Betro held at HMP New Hall, a closed category women's prison in West Yorkshire, her journey to Birmingham would require a six hour daily round trip, giving her limited access to her lawyer. The court considered either postponing the trial so it could be held at a venue closer to HMP New Hall, such as Nottingham Crown Court, or moving her to HMP Foston Hall in Derbyshire, which is closer to Birmingham. However, it was felt that Foston Hall would not be suitable for Betro, whose prison category status is equivalent to a Category A male prisoner. (Note: Female prisons in England and Wales are categorised as open or closed, as opposed to male prisons, which are categorised as A, B, C and D, depending on the potential risk to the public of the offenders being held there.) The court was told that Betro was accommodated in a single cell at New Hall, that the prison would make provisions for her to have access to food upon her return from court, and that Betro herself was keen for the trial to proceed. Her trial began at Birmingham Crown Court on 21 July. The case was prosecuted by Tom Walkling KC, and defended by Paul Lewis KC, while Simon Drew KC was the presiding judge.

The court was shown CCTV footage of Betro waiting outside Mahumad's house on 7 September 2019, and the subsequent attempted shooting incident. The trial also heard that afterwards, Betro had sent Mahumad taunting text messages, including ones that said "Where are you hiding?" and "Stop playing hide and seek, you are lucky it jammed," as well as one asking him to meet her at a nearby Asda supermarket. The jury was also told that Betro had booked the taxi to return to Mahumad's property in the name of Becky Booth, the same name she had used to purchase the car, and that the taxi had been ordered by an American woman.

The trial also heard that on 16 October, Betro had travelled to Palatine, Illinois, a town 100 miles from her home to post parcels to the UK at a post office, using the name M Chandler, and that the man she and Nazir had tried to frame was initially arrested, but later cleared of any involvement. The court was told that DNA was recovered from the contents of three packages that arrived in the UK.

Betro told the court that prior to the August 2019 trip, she had visited the UK to meet Nazir on two previous occasions, and that they had slept together at an Airbnb property in London during one of those visits. She said that she had feelings for Nazir, and was in love with him. She told the hearing that she returned to the UK in August 2019 to celebrate her birthday, for "random touristy things", and because she had won tickets to a "boat party in London". She claimed that the CCTV footage was not of her, but of another American woman who sounded, dressed and looked like her. She also claimed to have no knowledge of the shooting, and said that Nazir had not mentioned a shooting during their time together in the US.

Following the three week trial, the jury deliberated for 21 hours before convicting her on 12 August 2025. Betro was found guilty of conspiracy to murder, possession of a firearm with intent to cause fear of violence, and illegal importation of ammunition into the UK. At a hearing on 21 August, she was sentenced to thirty years in prison for conspiracy to murder, and told she would serve two thirds of the sentence. In his sentencing statement, Drew told Betro: "I accept Nazir recruited you but you were the gunwoman and the person who was prepared to fire the gun. As a result you showed you were willing to carry out the killing yourself." In addition to the 30 year custodial term, she received two concurrent sentences of six years for possessing a firearm and two years for importing prohibited items. Her sentence means she will become eligible to be considered for parole on 14 March 2044.

Following the sentencing hearing, Detective Chief Inspector Alastair Orencas of West Midlands Police described Betro's attempt to disguise herself with a niqab as "fairly poor" because "the footwear didn't change, phones didn't change" and various CCTV cameras caught her in the area of the shooting. He described the case as "a unique case which has involved a huge amount of work tracing the movements of Betro from her arrival into the UK, her subsequent failed attempt to shoot a man dead, and her departure from the UK". He also said that police had found no evidence that Betro was paid for the attempted shooting. Hannah Sidaway, a specialist prosecutor at the Crown Prosecution Service, said "Only Betro knows what truly motivated her or what she sought to gain from becoming embroiled in a crime that meant she travelled hundreds of miles from Wisconsin to Birmingham to execute an attack on a man she did not know".
