= Netherton, Wakefield =

Coordinates: 53.644°N 1.579°W

Netherton
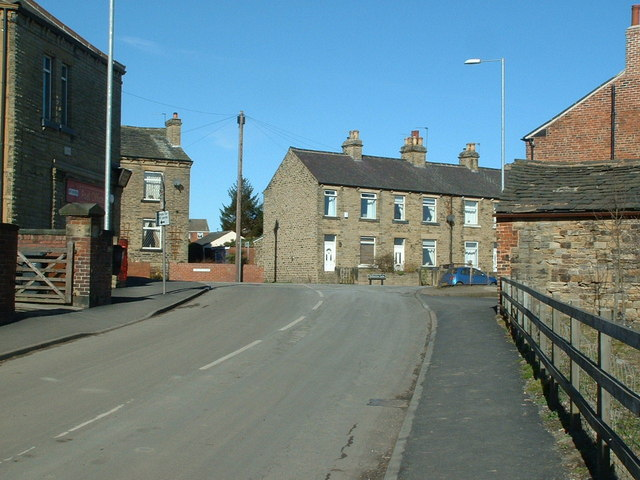
- Netherton

- Location within West Yorkshire
- OS grid reference: SE2716
- Metropolitan borough: City of Wakefield
- Metropolitan county: West Yorkshire
- Region: Yorkshire and the Humber
- Country: England
- Sovereign state: United Kingdom
- Post town: Wakefield
- Postcode district: WF4
- Dialling code: 01924
- Police: West Yorkshire
- Fire: West Yorkshire
- Ambulance: Yorkshire
- UK Parliament: Wakefield

Netherton is a village in the City of Wakefield metropolitan borough of West Yorkshire, England. It lies about 4 miles south-west of Wakefield, 3 miles south of Ossett and 1 mile south of Horbury. The village is in the Wakefield Rural ward of Wakefield Metropolitan District Council. The village name is shown on map "Dvcatvs Eboracensis pars occidentalis" from 1646.

The h was dropped from nearby Shitlington and Sitlington was adopted in 1929 with the approval of the county council.

== History ==
Netherton, originally Nether Shitlington was, with Over Shitlington (Overton) and Middle Shitlington (Middlestown), part of the township of Shitlington in the ancient ecclesiastical parish of Thornhill in the wapentake of Agbrigg and Morley in the West Riding of Yorkshire. A Mesolithic axe was found near the Star Inn in 1963. Shitlington was probably settled in Anglo-Saxon times and was recorded in the Domesday Book as Schellingtone.

Netherton Hall, a Grade II* listed manor house, was built around 1775 for the Perkins family. St Andrew's Church was built in 1881 to the design of J. D. Sedding.

=== Coal mining ===
A mineral line connecting Sir John Lister Lister-Kaye's Caphouse Colliery to the Lancashire and Yorkshire Railway's Barnsley branch and coal staithes on the Calder and Hebble Navigation at Calder Grove passed through Netherton. It passed the hamlet of Little London on South Lane where the company owned the Victoria Pit. The Prince of Wales Pit, locally known as Wood Pit, was sunk near the line near New Hall Wood in 1870 and its shaft was deepened and widened in 1882. A second shaft was sunk 12 years later. A drift was driven in 1926 and another 30 years later. At nationalisation in 1947 the pit was named Denby Grange (Prince of Wales). It merged with Caphouse Colliery in 1981 and closed in August 1991. During the 1984-85 strike, it was known as one of the few pits in Yorkshire where the majority returned to work before the end, which was attributed to how many of the miners commuted from outside the village and did not have a "local, cohesive community". Its site is now occupied by Earnshaws who have operated a timber business in Midgley since 1860.

Hartley Bank Colliery was sunk in 1872 on the south side of the Calder and Hebble Navigation and closed in 1968. A disaster occurred in May 1924 when firedamp ignited, killing five miners and injuring 26 men.

== Geography ==
The village is situated on the road from Horbury Bridge to Midgley, the B6117, on a hill above the valley of the River Calder. The underlying geology comprises the Coal Measures of the South Yorkshire Coalfield.

== Notable people ==
The members of indie rock band The Cribs are originally from Netherton.

== See also ==
- Listed buildings in Sitlington
