= National Coal Mining Museum for England =

Museum in West Yorkshire, England

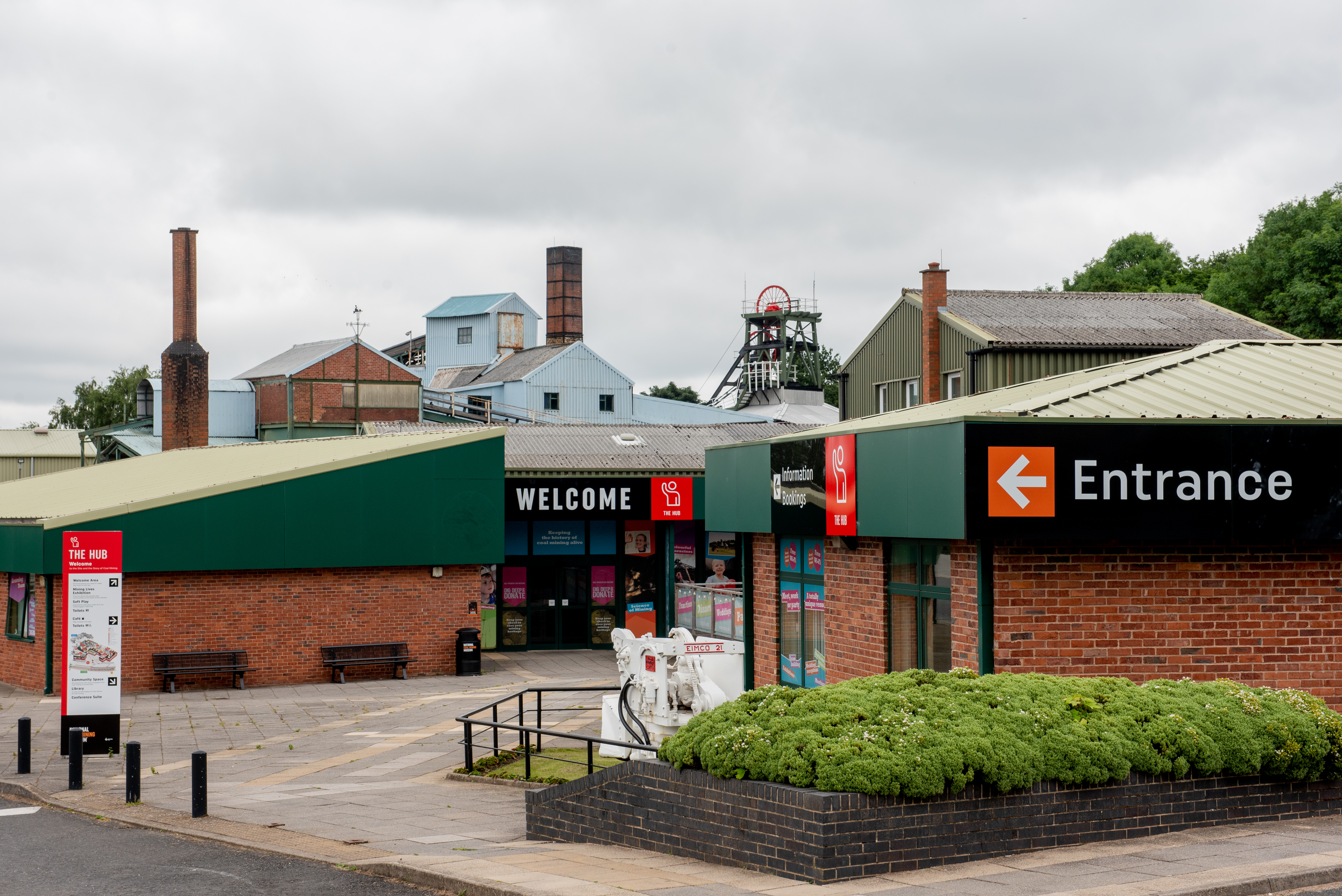
- National Coal Mining Museum
- Former name: Yorkshire Mining Museum
- Established: 1988
- Location: Caphouse Colliery, New Road, Overton, Wakefield in West Yorkshire, England
- Coordinates: 53.6433°N 1.6211°W
- Type: Heritage centre
- Collection size: Over 45,000
- Visitors: c. 138,291 (2019/20)
- Employees: c. 85 (March 2021)
- Website: www.ncm.org.uk

National Coal Mining Museum for England is based at the site of Caphouse Colliery in Overton, Wakefield, West Yorkshire, England. It opened in 1988 as the Yorkshire Mining Museum and was granted national status in 1995.

== History ==
Caphouse Colliery was sunk in the 1770s or 1780s and the Hope Pit in the 1820s. Sir John Lister Kaye of Denby Grange took over James Milnes' leases the mineral rights in 1827 and his pits became the Denby Grange Colliery. The boiler house and stone and brick chimney at the museum are Grade II listed structures built around 1876 for Emma Lister Kaye along with the steam winding engine house, boiler yard, heapstead and ventilation shaft which are Grade II* listed. The boiler house has two Lancashire boilers and powered the winding engine. The timber headgear at Caphouse and the wood framed screens building at Hope Pit date from between 1905 and 1911. Pithead baths and an administration block were built between 1937 and 1938.

Lockwood and Elliott who owned Shuttle Eye Colliery had acquired the colliery by 1942. The colliery was nationalised in 1947 and a drift mine opened in 1974. The colliery closed in 1985.

Under the directorship of Margaret Faull, the Yorkshire Mining Museum opened in 1988. The museum became the National Coal Mining Museum in 1995. In October 2022, the museum staff voted to strike over a below inflation pay offer. In 2025 a strike among staff started on 20 August over pay. The strike ended April 2026 with a 10.5% wage increase.

== Museum ==
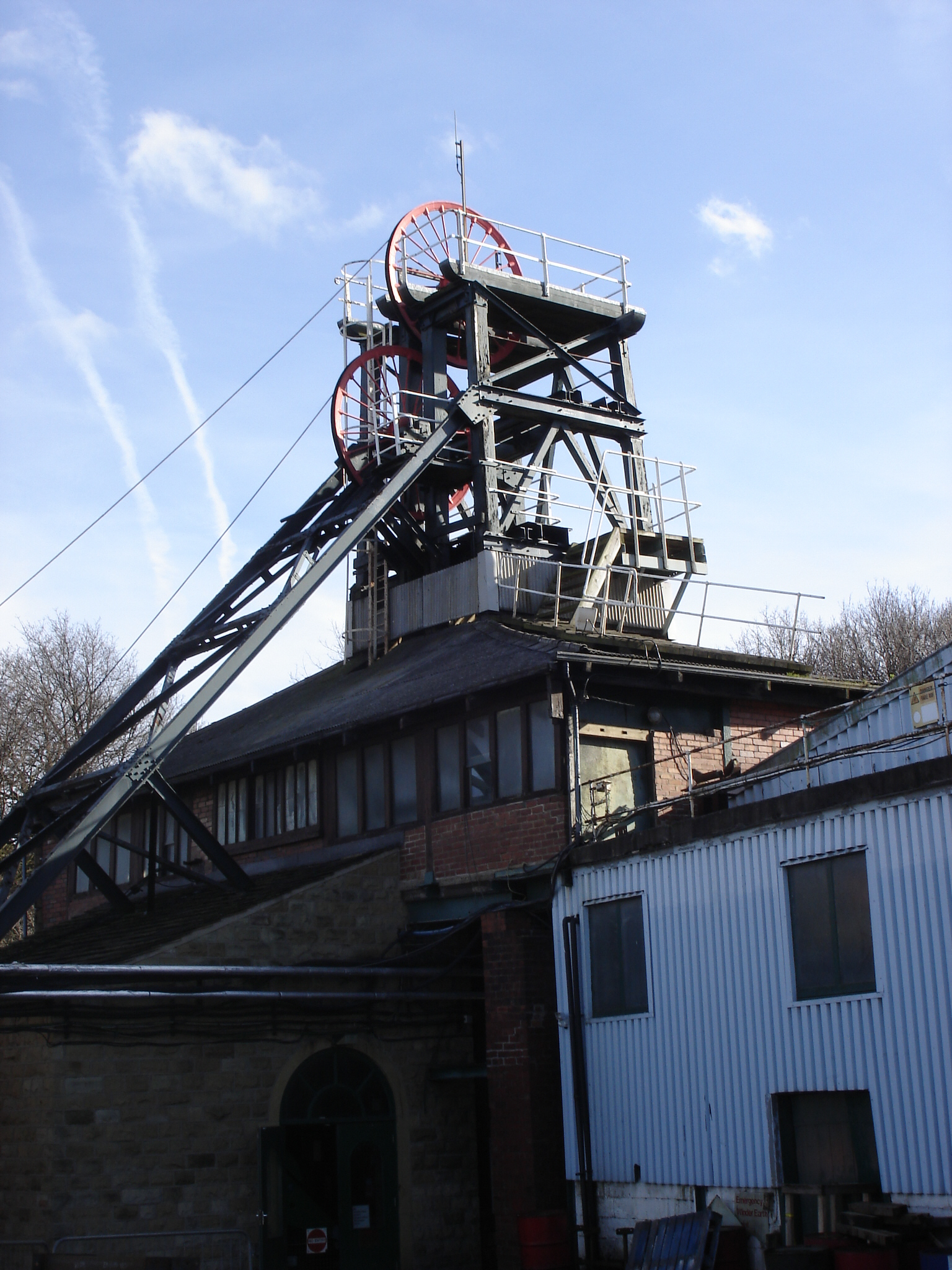
Headstock

The museum offers guided underground tours where visitors can experience the conditions miners worked in and see the tools and machines they used as the industry and the mine developed through the years.

Above ground, the museum sits on a 45-acre (18 ha) semi-rural site, with over a dozen galleries documenting the social and industrial history of the mines. The extensive library and archive contains a first edition of De re Metallica, as well as issues of "Coal News" and details of collieries throughout England. There are numerous other original features on site, including the pit head baths, steam winding house, boiler house and coal screening plant. The site maintains an operating paddy train connecting the main Caphouse hub to the Hope Pit area of the site, where a natural Water Treatment facility with reed beds and bird hides is operated in partnership with the Coal Authority. There is also an interpretive nature trail connecting the wooded valley area of the site.

The museum has had many developments in recent years. The Miners Memorial Garden was opened in 2015, and a large mining-themed adventure playground was built in 2017. Significant improvements to the visitor welcome hub, which contains the museum's retail, education, catering and conferencing facilities were made from 2018 onwards owing to funding from the National Lottery Heritage Fund.

Since the early 1990s, the museum has hosted pit ponies and other horses with links to the Coal Mining industry. A new interactive Pony Discovery Centre was opened in 2021 replacing the older stables block sited in the Boiler Yard.

The museum is an Anchor Point of ERIH, the European Route of Industrial Heritage.

The museum held the exhibition 'My Mining Days' for mining artist Tom Lamb in 2008–2009.

== Collection ==
=== Railway Locomotives ===
==== Battery Electric Locomotives ====
- Narrow Gauge
  - Atlas 2463
  - 713007 (Clayton B0182B)
  - Clayton No. 7
  - Clayton B3538

==== Diesel Hydraulic Locomotives ====
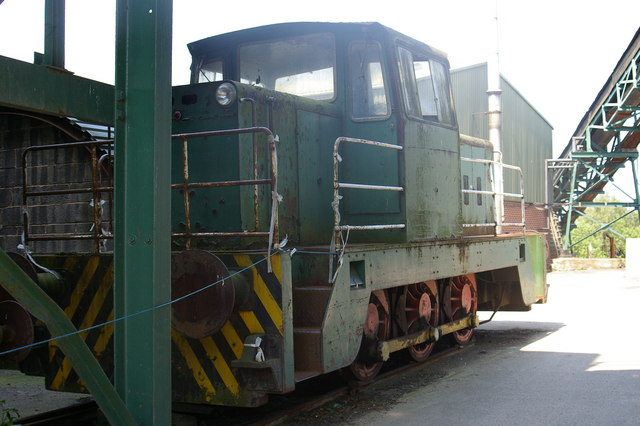

- Narrow Gauge
  - Hunslet 7530
  - Hunslet 8832 (flameproof)
  - YKSMM 2001.831 (GMT 4w-4wDHF Rack)
  - GMT 0592 KIRSTIN
  - Hunslet 9271 (rack fitted)
- Standard Gauge
  - NCB 44 (Hunslet 6684)
  - Hunslet 7307
  - Thomas Hill 249V

==== Diesel Mechanical Locomotives ====
- Narrow Gauge
  - Hunslet 6273
  - Hudswell-Clarke DM1356
  - Hudswell-Clarke DM655
  - Hudswell-Clarke DM746
  - Ruston & Hornsby 375547
  - Ruston & Hornsby 379659
- Standard Gauge
  - Hudswell-Clarke D1121 MANTON

==== Steam locomotives ====
- Standard Gauge
  - RSH 7298 PROGRESS 0-6-0ST

== Location ==
The museum is situated on the A642, in Overton near Middlestown between Wakefield and Huddersfield. It is signposted from the M1 motorway. It can be reached by car or public transport.

The museum features regularly on television programmes, especially those with a focus on genealogy and mining culture.

== See also ==
- Rhondda Heritage Park and Big Pit National Coal Museum in the South Wales Valleys
- National Mining Museum Scotland
- Listed buildings in Sitlington
