= Wakefield Eastern Relief Road =

Road in England

The Wakefield Eastern Relief Road (A6194, also known as Neil Fox Way) is a new single-carriageway road opened in 2017, running generally north–south on the eastern edge of Wakefield, linking the A638 near Heath Common to the A642 at Stanley, south of junction 30 of the M62. It is intended to relieve congestion within Wakefield and to support the development of 2,500 new houses at the City Fields development, an urban extension to the east of the city.

The 7.5 km road was the first project constructed as part of the West Yorkshire Combined Authority's 10-year programme of strategic transport schemes planned to promote growth and create employment across the region. Funding for the schemes is through the £1bn Leeds City Region Enterprise Partnership (LEP) Growth Deal from the UK Government's Local Growth Fund.

The road was named Neil Fox Way after rugby player Neil Fox.
