= Overton, West Yorkshire =

Village in West Yorkshire, England

Coordinates: 53.6472°N 1.60763°W

Overton
- Location within West Yorkshire
- OS grid reference: SE260168
  - London: 160 mi (260 km) SSE
- Metropolitan borough: City of Wakefield
- Metropolitan county: West Yorkshire
- Region: Yorkshire and the Humber
- Country: England
- Sovereign state: United Kingdom
- Post town: WAKEFIELD
- Postcode district: WF4
- Dialling code: 01924
- Police: West Yorkshire
- Fire: West Yorkshire
- Ambulance: Yorkshire
- UK Parliament: Ossett and Denby Dale

Overton is a village between Wakefield and Huddersfield in West Yorkshire, England. The village is situated approximately 5.5 miles (9 km) south-west of Wakefield, 4 miles (6 km) south of Ossett, 1 mile (1.6 km) west of Netherton and 4 miles south-west of Horbury. Overton is conjoined at its north-east to the larger village of Middlestown. Coxley Woods are less than 1 mile (1.6 km) to the south-east.

Overton was historically called 'Over Shitlington', and was one of four villages in the township of 'Shitlington' in the civil parish of Thornhill. In 1881 Overton was in the county court district and Poor Law Union of Wakefield. Village occupations at the time included two farmers, a shopkeeper, the manager of "Cap House pit," and the landlords of The Reindeer and The Black Swan public houses. Shitlington was officially changed to Sitlington in 1929.

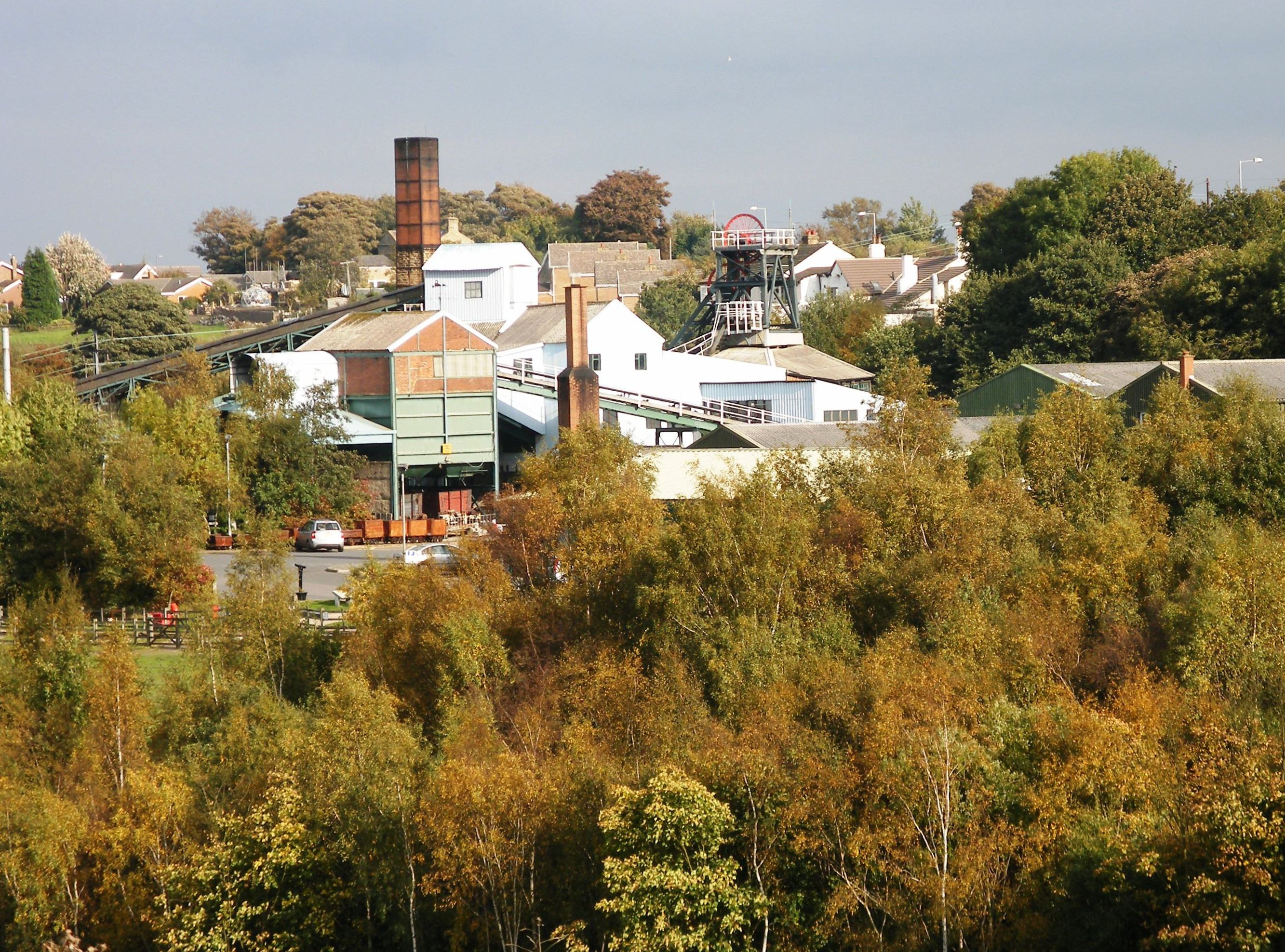
National Mining Museum at Caphouse Colliery, Overton

St Luke's Parish Church in Overton is part of the ecclesiastical parish of Middlestown with Netherton.

Overton is significant for the National Coal Mining Museum, situated on the A642. The former Caphouse Colliery was worked from at least 1789 until the coal was exhausted in 1985 when work was started to convert it to a museum.

== See also ==
- Listed buildings in Sitlington
