= Flockton Collieries =

Coal mine in West Yorkshire, England

Coordinates: 53.632°N 1.631°W

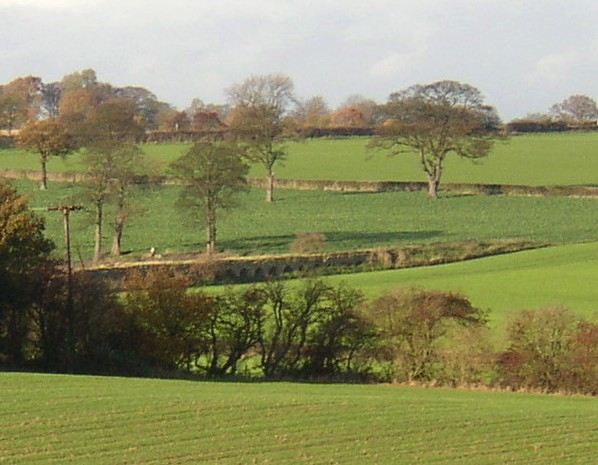
Old Flockton Colliery railway bridge

The Flockton Collieries were small, shallow coal pits that exploited the coal seams north of the village of Flockton in the West Riding of Yorkshire, England. The coal seams, the Flockton Thick, which was up to 48 inches, and the Flockton Thin at about 15 inches, were named from where they outcropped.

In the 17th century, coal master, Richard Carter who died around 1700, made his fortune from the pits, some of which he used to build the village's first church, almshouses and the school. The coal was sold locally until the River Calder was made navigable above Wakefield after 1758.
