= Middlestown =

Village in West Yorkshire, England

Coordinates: 53.6509485°N 1.5970785°W

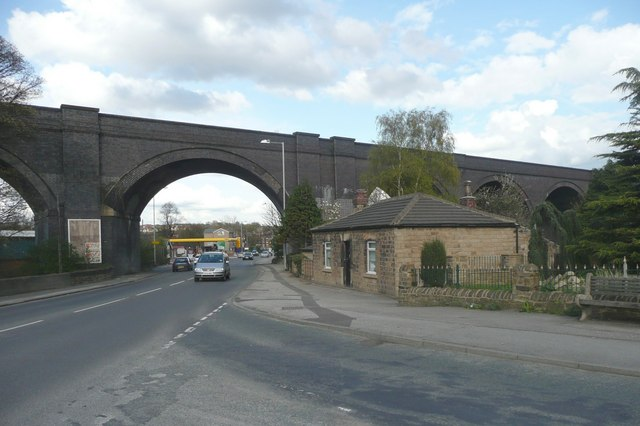
- Disused railway viaduct and former toll house on New Road, A642 road

- Location within West Yorkshire
- Metropolitan borough: City of Wakefield
- Metropolitan county: West Yorkshire
- Region: Yorkshire and the Humber
- Country: England
- Sovereign state: United Kingdom
- Post town: Wakefield
- Postcode district: WF4
- Dialling code: 01924
- Police: West Yorkshire
- Fire: West Yorkshire
- Ambulance: Yorkshire
- UK Parliament: Ossett and Denby Dale

Middlestown is a small village in the Wakefield District in West Yorkshire, England. The village is in the civil parish of Sitlington and located halfway between the city of Wakefield and the town of Huddersfield, and is 3 miles (5 km) south east of Dewsbury.

== History ==
The villages of Middlestown, Netherton, Overton and Midgley are built around and overlook the Coxley Valley. Whilst the village is not recorded in the Domesday Book, the place-name is recorded as far back as 1322 as Middles(c)hitelington. This was originally Middle Shitlington, the Middle part of that parish,which was renamed to Sitlington in 1929, to avoid the rude inference of the word Shit.

The Middlestown built-up area contains two Nature Reserves, managed by Yorkshire Wildlife Trust, and is also home to the National Coal Mining Museum for England in neighbouring Overton. The population of the built-up area at the 2011 census was 2,366.

The M1 motorway is within 5 miles (8 km) from the village. The A642 road between Huddersfield and Wakefield passes through the village, it was built in the 1830s as a turnpike.

== See also ==
- Listed buildings in Sitlington
