= Caphouse Colliery =

Coal mine in West Yorkshire, England

Coordinates: 53.6433°N 1.6211°W

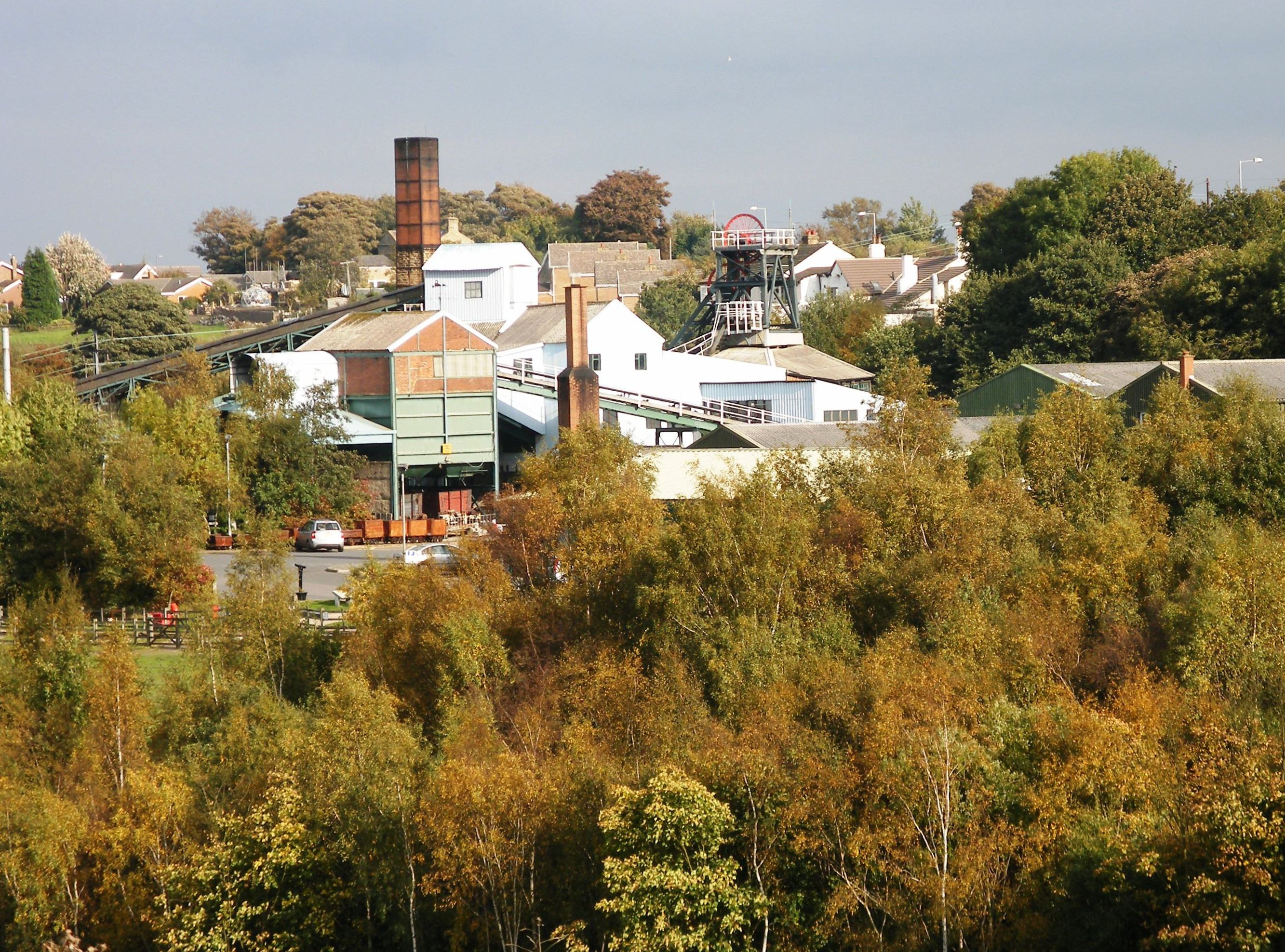
Caphouse Colliery

Caphouse Colliery, originally known as Overton Colliery, was a coal mine in Overton, near Wakefield, West Yorkshire, England. It was situated on the Denby Grange estate owned by the Lister Kaye family, and was worked from the 18th century until 1985. It reopened as the Yorkshire Mining Museum in 1988, and is now the National Coal Mining Museum for England.

== History ==
The colliery was on the Denby Grange Estate, home of the Lister Kayes, in an area where coal had been mined for many years. Coal was close to the surface and the Flockton Thick Seam was mined in 1793. Leases for mining coal were held by Timothy Smith who leased the original Denby Grange Colliery north of Flockton and James Milnes who mined coal at Emroyd and Old Flockton. Some coal was supplied locally, but much more was sent to distant markets to the east of Pontefract via the Calder and Hebble Navigation. Smith's coal pits were under the control of Sir John Lister Kaye by 1817 and were managed by estate managers including John Blenkinsop of the Middleton Collieries who oversaw the enlargement of the enterprise in the 1820s. His son, Sir John Lister Lister-Kaye took over the lease for getting coal from the Overton Colliery on his own estate from the executors of James Milnes in 1827 and began to expand the colliery. Milnes' pits were linked to the Calder and Hebble Navigation at Horbury Bridge by a wooden wagonway which was later laid with iron rails.

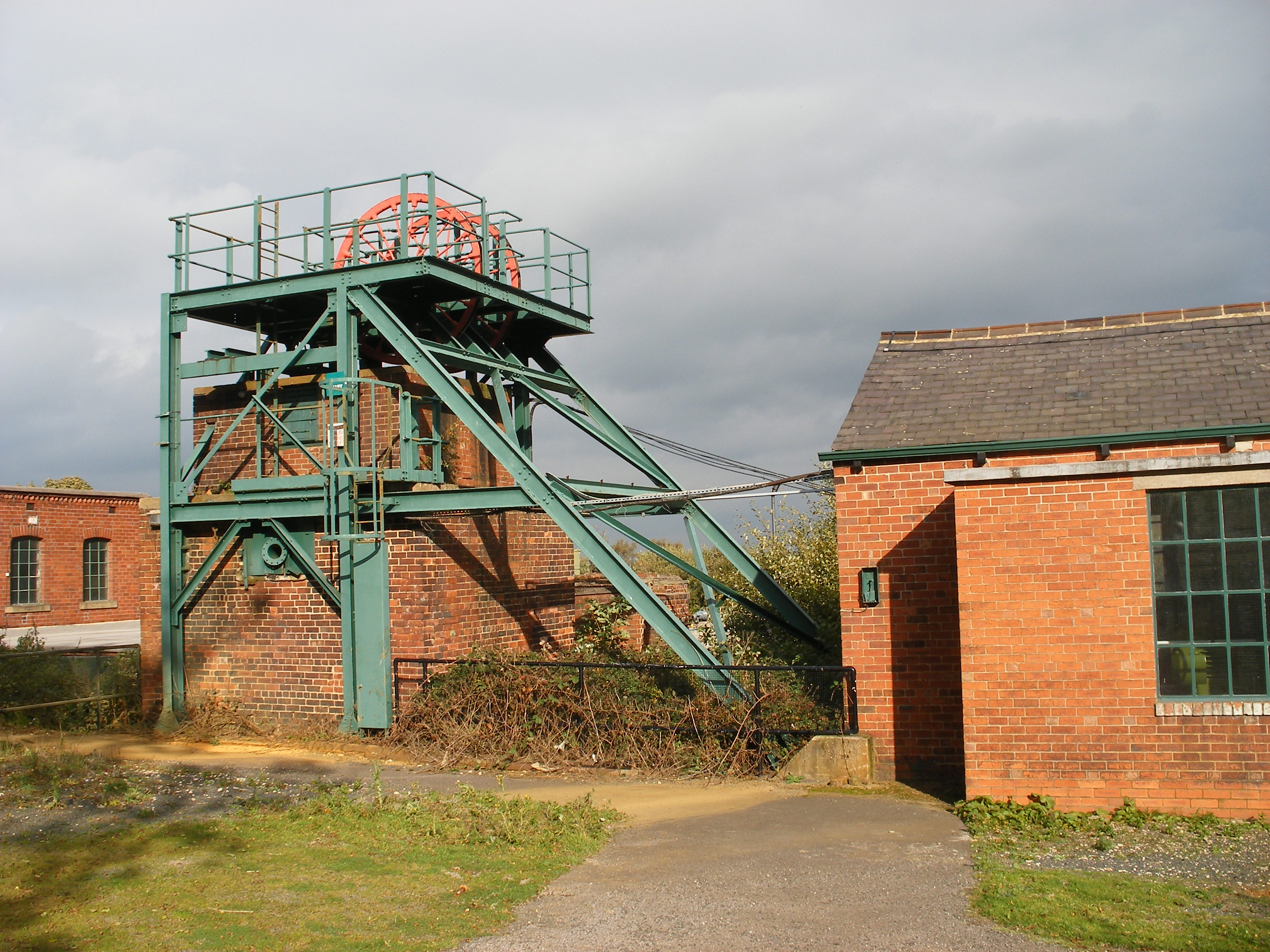
Hope Pit

Hope Pit was sunk close by in 1827 and the Blossom Pit on the opposite side of the Wakefield to Austerlands turnpike road, the A642, was sunk by 1840. Hope Pit's shaft descends 215 yards and produced coal after 1829. The coal was wound by horse gins until the 1920s. It was one of the earliest Yorkshire coal mines to use electrical coal cutters. The Inman Water Shaft was sunk to 97 yards in about 1840 to pump water from Hope Pit and its beam engine house survives. The shaft was later deepened to the New Hards Seam. The pits were originally ventilated by furnaces at the shaft bottoms.

Caphouse Colliery was again developed in 1876 when the steam winding engine house, boiler yard, chimney, stone heapstead and ventilation shaft were completed for Emma Lister Kay, the sole proprietor. The headframe is built of pitch pine with steel braces, a late survivor of its type. The Caphouse shaft is 11 feet in diameter and although it had been deepened and widened may have been the oldest working mine shaft in the country in the 1980s. In 1892 colliers were paid 4/6d. per day and 13/6d. in 1938. In 1901 the colliery employed 93 workers and this total rose to 206 in 1911, and 240 in 1918.

The colliery was sold in 1907. After the sale, the name Denby Grange Collieries referred to Caphouse and the Prince of Wales Colliery (locally known as Wood Pit) situated near New Hall in Flockton.

Pithead baths and an administration block were built around 1937 and surface buildings upgraded between 1943 and 1946. The colliery became part of the National Coal Board on nationalisation in 1947. A drift mine opened in 1974. In 1978 the colliery employed 230 men winning 4,000 tons of coal per week from the Beeston Seam. The coal reserves were exhausted by 1985 and the colliery closed. It reopened as the Yorkshire Mining Museum in 1988.

== Mineral line ==
Sir John Lister Lister-Kaye (1801-1871) linked Hope Pit, Caphouse, and Victoria Pits at Netherton to the Lancashire and Yorkshire Railway's Barnsley branch and the Calder and Hebble Navigation at Calder Grove by a private mineral line. John Marsden who managed the colliery from 1852 for Sir John Lister Lister-Kaye designed and built the line to avoid tolls charged for using the turnpike. The line began near Hope Pit with a tunnel under the Wakefield - Austerlands turnpike. Two rope-hauled inclines the second partly in a tunnel were needed before the line reached the navigation or the railway. Two locomotives, four-wheeled Solferino and six-wheeled Balaklava were bought to operate the line. The Prince of Wales Pit (subsequently named Denby Grange Colliery) was sunk close to the line near New Hall Wood in 1870.

The mineral railway fell out of use apart from the end section when road transport was favoured over rail in the late 1940s.

== See also ==
- Listed buildings in Sitlington
