= Grange Moor =

Coordinates: 53.64°N 01.66°W

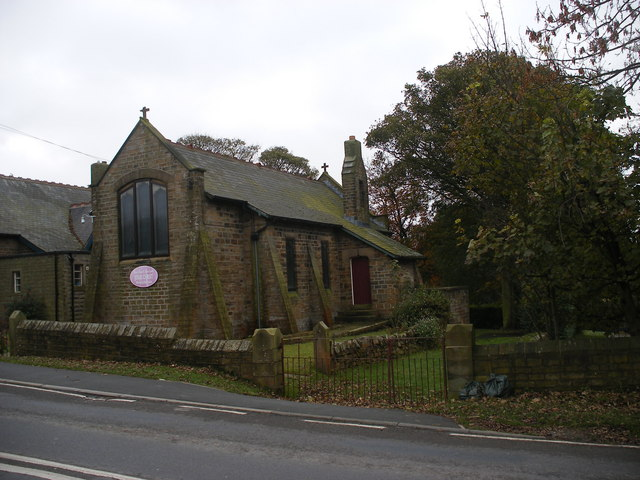

- Location within West Yorkshire
- Area: 0.3400 km^{2} (0.1313 sq mi)
- Population: 1,101 (2019 estimate)
  - Density: 3,238/km^{2} (8,390/sq mi)
- OS grid reference: SE2216
- Civil parish: Kirkburton
- Metropolitan borough: Kirklees
- Metropolitan county: West Yorkshire
- Region: Yorkshire and the Humber
- Country: England
- Sovereign state: United Kingdom
- Police: West Yorkshire
- Fire: West Yorkshire
- Ambulance: Yorkshire

Grange Moor is a village in the civil parish of Kirkburton, in the Kirklees district of West Yorkshire, England, between Huddersfield (6 miles (10 km) away) and Wakefield (9 miles (14 km) away). In 2019, it had an estimated population of 1,101.

The village is represented on Kirkburton parish council and is in the Kirkburton ward of Kirklees Council.

Grange Moor is on moorland with the same name and is to the north of a road junction on the A642, A637 and B6118 roads. Shuttle Eye Colliery was near the crossroads, its site now being occupied by warehousing.

The local church is dedicated to St Bartholomew. See 'External links' below for a survey of the burials in the churchyard.

Grange Moor Brass Band was formed 1854, and has had a band room in the village since 1937.

During the Second World War, a V-1 missile struck the site of Dumb Steeple Farm. The crater was reported to be 33ft in diameter and around 5ft deep. According to the then owner of the farm and village butcher, George Halstead, cattle sheds and poultry huts suffered significant damage, but no loss of animal life occurred. Sources also report that ceilings collapsed and window panes were shattered across the village as a result of the explosion. Other sites, such as the Methodist Chapel, suffered major damage. Despite the damage, no human casualties were reported throughout the village. Today, the former site of Dumb Steeple Farm is a residential area, having largely been redeveloped as Greenfield Crescent and surrounding housing.

The Dumb Steeple is a Grade II listed monument dating back to at least the mid-18th century. According to village tradition, it marked the boundary between the Beaumonts of Whitley and the Kayes of Denby Grange. A plaque can be found on the monument with the inscription, "Rebuilt By Rich.d H. Beau:mont Esq.r 1766", an abbreviation of "Rebuilt By Richard H. Beaumont Esquire 1766."

== Transport ==
Arriva Yorkshire and South Pennine operate bus services towards Huddersfield (services 231 and X41) and Dewsbury (service 230/A)
