= A642 road =

A-road in West Yorkshire, England

A642

Major junctions
- West end: Huddersfield; 53.6451°N 1.7357°W
- East end: Garforth; 53.8053°N 1.3616°W

Location
- Country: United Kingdom
- Primary destinations: Wakefield

Road network
- Roads in the United Kingdom; Motorways; A and B road zones

The A642 is an A-road in West Yorkshire, England which runs from Huddersfield to the A64 near Leeds. It partly follows the route of a historic turnpike road, which is evidenced by surviving toll houses.

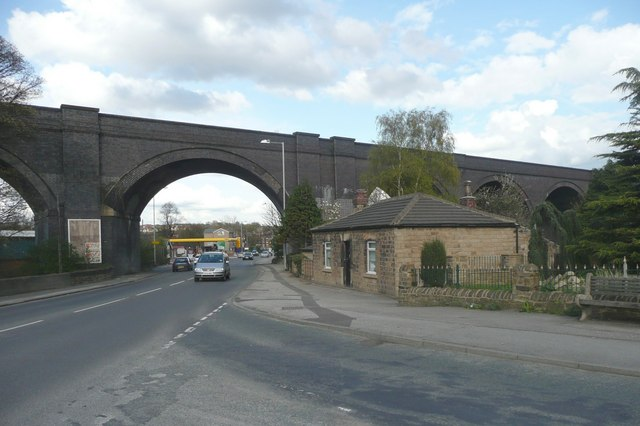
Former toll house on the A642 in Middlestown

The road begins at Waterloo 2 miles (3 km) east of the town centre at the junction with A629 and continues via Lepton to Grange Moor where the A637 branches off. From there it passes through Middlestown and Horbury (on the Horbury bypass) and leads to the junction with A638 west of Wakefield City Centre.

In Wakefield it follows the route of A638 and A61, branching off the latter north of the city centre and continuing via Stanley, Junction 30 of the M62 Motorway, Oulton, Swillington, and Garforth before meeting the M1 Motorway at Junction 47, where also A656 joins. North of the latter, the road continues as B1217.

It is joined by B6433 in Lepton and B6118 in Grange Moor, crosses B6117 in Horbury Bridge, A639 in Oulton, B6475 in Lupset, and A61 in Wakefield City Centre. Branches of B6128 join west and east of Horbury. East of Horbury it passes under the M1 motorway without a junction. The new Wakefield Eastern Relief Road, opened in 2017, connects to the A642 in Stanley.
