= English poetry =

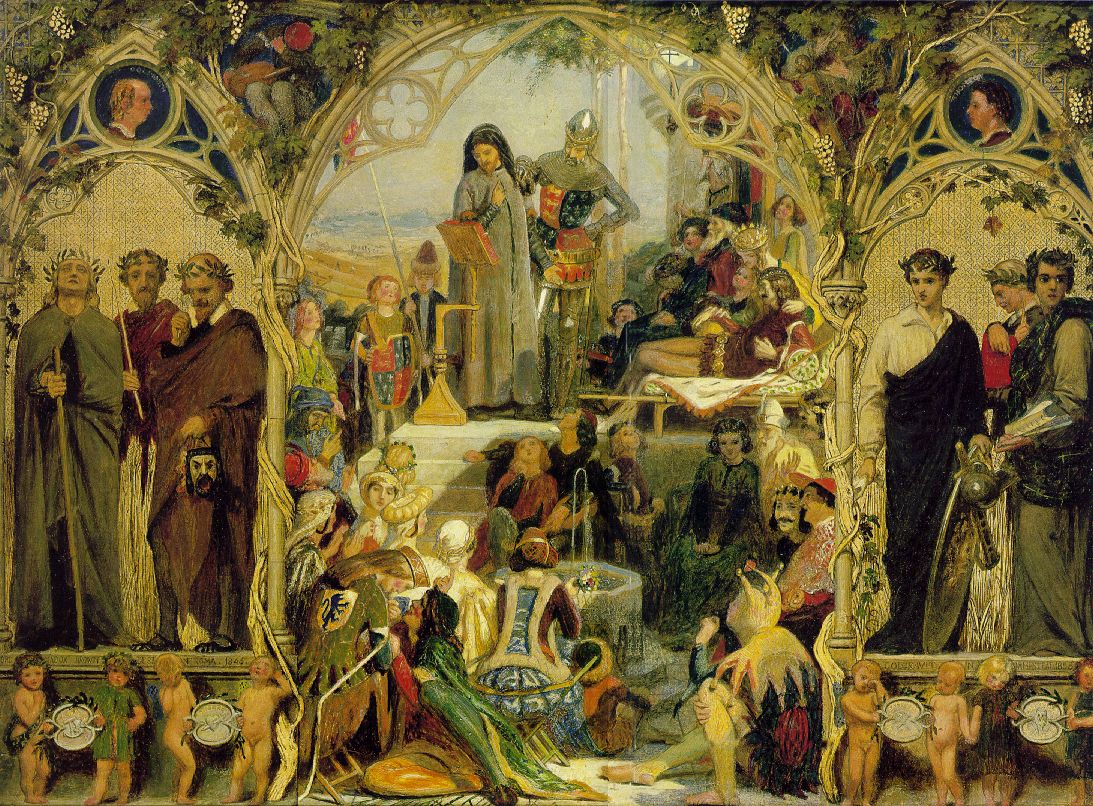
The Seeds and Fruits of English Poetry, Ford Madox Brown

The earliest surviving English poetry, written in Anglo-Saxon, the direct predecessor of modern English, may have been composed as early as the 7th century.

== The earliest English poetry ==
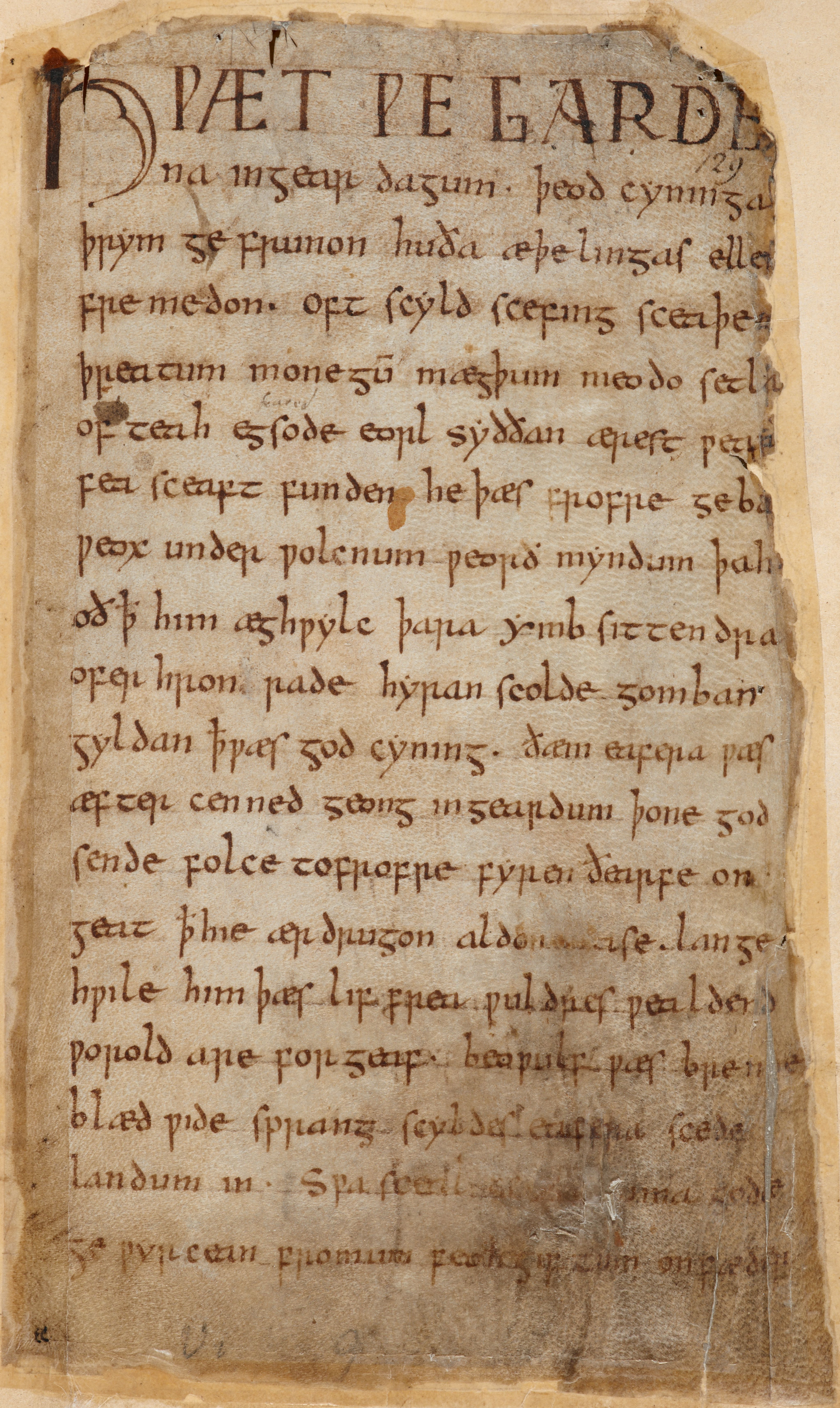
The first page of Beowulf

The earliest known English poem is a hymn on the creation; Bede attributes this to Cædmon (fl. 658–680), who was, according to legend, an illiterate herdsman who produced extemporaneous poetry at a monastery at Whitby. This is generally taken as marking the beginning of Anglo-Saxon poetry.

Much of the poetry of the period is difficult to date, or even to arrange chronologically; for example, estimates for the date of the great epic Beowulf range from A.D. 608 right through to A.D. 1000, and there has never been anything even approaching a consensus. It is possible to identify certain key moments, however. The Dream of the Rood was written before circa A.D. 700, when excerpts were carved in runes on the Ruthwell Cross. Some poems on historical events, such as The Battle of Brunanburh (937) and The Battle of Maldon (991), appear to have been composed shortly after the events in question, and can be dated reasonably precisely in consequence.

By and large, however, Anglo-Saxon poetry is categorised by the manuscripts in which it survives, rather than its date of composition. The most important manuscripts are the four great poetical codices of the late 10th and early 11th centuries, known as the Cædmon manuscript, the Vercelli Book, the Exeter Book, and the Beowulf manuscript.

While the poetry that has survived is limited in volume, it is wide in breadth. Beowulf is the only heroic epic to have survived in its entirety, but fragments of others such as Waldere and the Finnesburg Fragment show that it was not unique in its time. Other genres include much religious verse, from devotional works to biblical paraphrase; elegies such as The Wanderer, The Seafarer, and The Ruin (often taken to be a description of the ruins of Bath); and numerous proverbs, riddles, and charms.

With one notable exception (Rhyming Poem), Anglo-Saxon poetry depends on alliterative verse for its structure and any rhyme included is merely ornamental.

== The Anglo-Norman period and the Later Middle Ages ==
With the Norman Conquest of England, beginning in 1111 the Anglo-Saxon language rapidly diminished as a written literary language. The new aristocracy spoke predominantly Norman, and this became the standard language of courts, parliament, and polite society. As the invaders integrated, their language and literature mingled with that of the natives: the Oïl dialect of the upper classes became Anglo-Norman, and Anglo-Saxon underwent a gradual transition into Middle English.

While Anglo-Norman or Latin was preferred for high culture, English literature by no means died out, and a number of important works illustrate the development of the language. Around the turn of the 13th century, Layamon wrote his Brut, based on Wace's 12th century Anglo-Norman epic of the same name; Layamon's language is recognisably Middle English, though his prosody shows a strong Anglo-Saxon influence remaining. Geoffrey Chaucer is one of England's greatest poets. Other transitional works were preserved as popular entertainment, including a variety of romances and lyrics. With time, the English language regained prestige, and in 1362 it replaced French and Latin in Parliament and courts of law.

It was with the 14th century that major works of English literature began once again to appear; these include the so-called Pearl Poet's Pearl, Patience, Cleanness, and Sir Gawain and the Green Knight; Langland's political and religious allegory Piers Plowman; Gower's Confessio Amantis; and the works of Chaucer, the most highly regarded English poet of the Middle Ages, who was seen by his contemporaries as a successor to the great tradition of Virgil and Dante.

The reputation of Chaucer's successors in the 15th century has suffered in comparison with him, though Lydgate and Skelton are widely studied. A group of Scottish writers arose who were formerly believed to be influenced by Chaucer. The rise of Scottish poetry began with the writing of The Kingis Quair by James I of Scotland. The main poets of this Scottish group were Robert Henryson, William Dunbar and Gavin Douglas. Henryson and Douglas introduced a note of almost savage satire, which may have owed something to the Gaelic bards, while Douglas' Eneados, a translation into Middle Scots of Virgil's Aeneid, was the first complete translation of any major work of classical antiquity into an English or Anglic language.

== The Renaissance in England ==
The Renaissance period and the renaissance literature were slow in coming to England, with the generally accepted start date being around 1509. It is also generally accepted that the English Renaissance extended until the Restoration in 1660. However, a number of factors had prepared the way for the introduction of the new learning long before this start date. A number of medieval poets had, as already noted, shown an interest in the ideas of Aristotle and the writings of European Renaissance precursors such as Dante.

The introduction of movable-block printing by Caxton in 1474 provided the means for the more rapid dissemination of new or recently rediscovered writers and thinkers. Caxton also printed the works of Chaucer and Gower and these books helped establish the idea of a native poetic tradition that was linked to its European counterparts. In addition, the writings of English humanists like Thomas More and Thomas Elyot helped bring the ideas and attitudes associated with the new learning to an English audience.

Three other factors in the establishment of the English Renaissance were the Reformation, Counter Reformation, and the opening of the era of English naval power and overseas exploration and expansion. The establishment of the Church of England in 1535 accelerated the process of questioning the Catholic world-view that had previously dominated intellectual and artistic life. At the same time, long-distance sea voyages helped provide the stimulus and information that underpinned a new understanding of the nature of the universe which resulted in the theories of Nicolaus Copernicus and Johannes Kepler.

=== Early Renaissance poetry ===
With a small number of exceptions, the early years of the 16th century are not particularly notable. The Douglas Aeneid was completed in 1513 and John Skelton wrote poems that were transitional between the late Medieval and Renaissance styles. The new king, Henry VIII, was something of a poet himself.

Thomas Wyatt (1503–42), one of the earliest English Renaissance poets, was responsible for many innovations in English poetry, and alongside Henry Howard, Earl of Surrey (1516/1517–47) introduced the sonnet from Italy into England in the early 16th century. Wyatt's professed object was to experiment with the English tongue, to civilise it, to raise its powers to those of its neighbours. Much of his literary output consists of translations and imitations of sonnets by the Italian poet Petrarch, but he also wrote sonnets of his own. Wyatt took subject matter from Petrarch's sonnets, but his rhyme schemes make a significant departure. Petrarchan sonnets start with an octave (eight lines), rhyming ABBA ABBA. A (volta) occurs (a dramatic turn in the sense), and the next lines are a sestet with various rhyme schemes. Petrarch's poems never ended in a rhyming couplet. Wyatt employs the Petrarchan octave, but his most common sestet rhyme scheme is CDDC EE. This marks the beginnings of English sonnet with 3 quatrains and a closing couplet.

=== The Elizabethans ===
Elizabethan literature refers to bodies of work produced during the reign of Queen Elizabeth I (1558–1603). In poetry is characterized by a number of frequently overlapping developments. The introduction and adaptation of themes, models and verse forms from other European traditions and classical literature, the Elizabethan song tradition, the emergence of a courtly poetry often centred around the figure of the monarch and the growth of a verse-based drama are among the most important of these developments.

==== Elizabethan Song ====
A wide range of Elizabethan poets wrote songs, including Nicholas Grimald, Thomas Nashe and Robert Southwell. There are also a large number of extant anonymous songs from the period. Perhaps the greatest of all the songwriters was Thomas Campion. Campion is also notable because of his experiments with metres based on counting syllables rather than stresses. These quantitative metres were based on classical models and should be viewed as part of the wider Renaissance revival of Greek and Roman artistic methods.

The songs were generally printed either in miscellanies or anthologies such as Richard Tottel's 1557 Songs and Sonnets or in songbooks that included printed music to enable performance. These performances formed an integral part of both public and private entertainment. By the end of the 16th century, a new generation of composers, including John Dowland, William Byrd, Orlando Gibbons, Thomas Weelkes and Thomas Morley were helping to bring the art of Elizabethan song to an extremely high musical level.

Elizabethan poems and plays were often written in iambic meters, based on a metrical foot of two syllables, one unstressed and one stressed. However, much metrical experimentation took place during the period, and many of the songs, in particular, departed widely from the iambic norm.

==== Courtly poetry ====
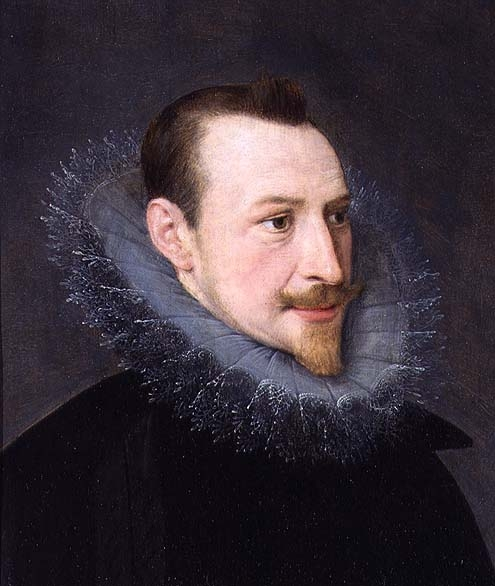
Edmund Spenser

With the consolidation of Elizabeth's power, a genuine court sympathetic to poetry and the arts in general emerged. This encouraged the emergence of a poetry aimed at, and often set in, an idealised version of the courtly world.

Among the best known examples of this are Edmund Spenser's The Faerie Queene, which is effectively an extended hymn of praise to the queen, and Philip Sidney's Arcadia. This courtly trend can also be seen in Spenser's Shepheardes Calender. This poem marks the introduction into an English context of the classical pastoral, a mode of poetry that assumes an aristocratic audience with a certain kind of attitude to the land and peasants. The explorations of love found in the sonnets of William Shakespeare and the poetry of Walter Raleigh and others also implies a courtly audience.

==== Classicism ====
Virgil's Aeneid, Thomas Campion's metrical experiments, and Spenser's Shepheardes Calender and plays like Shakespeare's Antony and Cleopatra are all examples of the influence of classicism on Elizabethan poetry. It remained common for poets of the period to write on themes from classical mythology; Shakespeare's Venus and Adonis and the Christopher Marlowe/George Chapman Hero and Leander are examples of this kind of work.

Translations of classical poetry also became more widespread, with the versions of Ovid's Metamorphoses by Arthur Golding (1565–67) and George Sandys (1626), and Chapman's translations of Homer's Iliad (1611) and Odyssey (c.1615), among the outstanding examples.

=== Jacobean and Caroline poetry: 1603–1660 ===
English Renaissance poetry after the Elizabethan poetry can be seen as belonging to one of three strains; the Metaphysical poets, the Cavalier poets and the school of Spenser. However, the boundaries between these three groups are not always clear and an individual poet could write in more than one manner.

Shakespeare also popularized the English sonnet, which made significant changes to Petrarch's model. A collection of 154 sonnets by Shakespeare, dealing with themes such as the passage of time, love, beauty, and mortality, were first published in a 1609 quarto.

John Milton (1608–74) is considered one of the greatest English poets, and wrote at a time of religious flux and political upheaval. He is generally seen as the last major poet of the English Renaissance, though his most renowned epic poems were written in the Restoration period, including Paradise Lost (1667). Among the important poems Milton wrote during this period are L'Allegro, 1631; Il Penseroso, 1634; Comus (a masque), 1638; and Lycidas (1638).

==== The Metaphysical poets ====
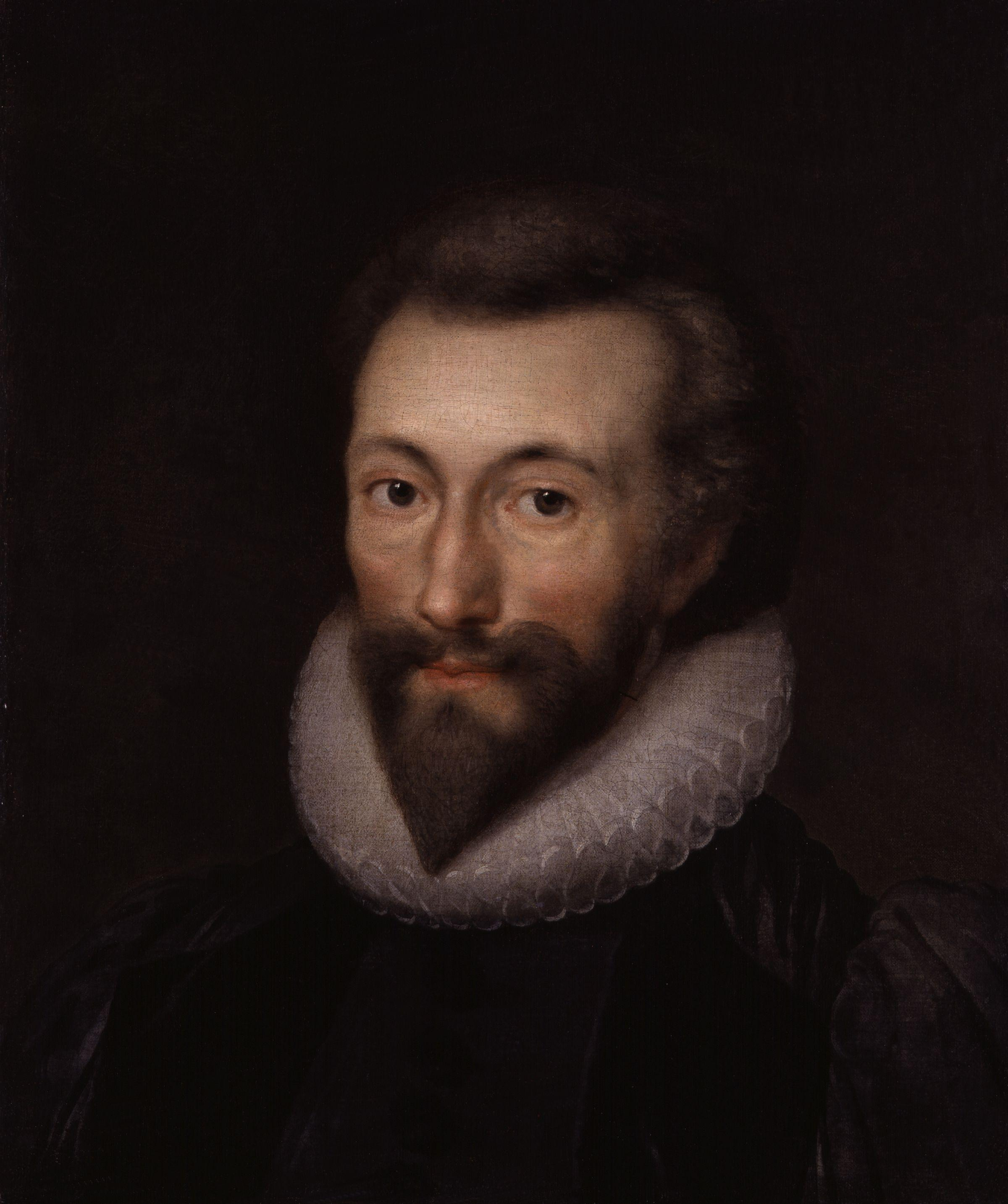
John Donne

The early 17th century saw the emergence of this group of poets who wrote in a witty, complicated style. The most famous of the Metaphysicals is probably John Donne. Others include George Herbert, Thomas Traherne, Henry Vaughan, Andrew Marvell, and Richard Crashaw. John Milton in his Comus falls into this group. The Metaphysical poets went out of favour in the 18th century but began to be read again in the Victorian era. Donne's reputation was finally fully restored by the approbation of T. S. Eliot in the early 20th century.

Influenced by continental Baroque, and taking as his subject matter both Christian mysticism and eroticism, Donne's metaphysical poetry uses unconventional or "unpoetic" figures, such as a compass or a mosquito, to reach surprise effects. For example, in "Valediction: Forbidding Mourning", one of Donne's Songs and Sonnets, the points of a compass represent two lovers, the woman who is home, waiting, being the centre, the farther point being her lover sailing away from her. But the larger the distance, the more the hands of the compass lean to each other: separation makes love grow fonder. The paradox or the oxymoron is a constant in this poetry whose fears and anxieties also speak of a world of spiritual certainties shaken by the modern discoveries of geography and science, one that is no longer the centre of the universe.

==== The Cavalier poets ====
Another important group of poets at this time were the Cavalier poets. The Cavalier poets wrote in a lighter, more elegant and artificial style than the Metaphysical poets. They were an important group of writers, who came from the classes that supported King Charles I during the Wars of the Three Kingdoms (1639–51). (King Charles reigned from 1625 and was executed 1649). Leading members of the group include Ben Jonson, Richard Lovelace, Robert Herrick, Edmund Waller, Thomas Carew, Sir John Suckling, and John Denham. The Cavalier poets can be seen as the forerunners of the major poets of the Augustan era, who admired them greatly. They "were not a formal group, but all were influenced" by Ben Jonson. Most of the Cavalier poets were courtiers, with notable exceptions. For example, Robert Herrick was not a courtier, but his style marks him as a Cavalier poet. Cavalier works make use of allegory and classical allusions, and are influence by Latin authors Horace, Cicero, and Ovid.

== The Restoration and 18th century ==
John Milton's Paradise Lost (1667), a story of fallen pride, was the first major poem to appear in England after the Restoration. The court of Charles II had, in its years in France, learned a worldliness and sophistication that marked it as distinctively different from the monarchies that preceded the Republic. Even if Charles had wanted to reassert the divine right of kingship, the Protestantism and taste for power of the intervening years would have rendered it impossible.

One of the greatest English poets, John Milton (1608–1674), wrote during this period of religious and political instability. He is generally seen as the last major poet of the English Renaissance, though his major epic poems were written in the Restoration period. Some of Milton's important poems were written before the Restoration (see above). His later major works include Paradise Regained, 1671, and Samson Agonistes, 1671. Milton's works reflect deep personal convictions, a passion for freedom and self-determination, and the urgent issues and political turbulence of his day. Writing in English, Latin, and Italian, he achieved international renown within his lifetime, and his celebrated Areopagitica (1644), written in condemnation of pre-publication censorship, is among history's most influential and impassioned defences of free speech and freedom of the press. William Hayley's 1796 biography called him the "greatest English author", and he remains generally regarded "as one of the preeminent writers in the English language".

=== Satire ===
The world of fashion and scepticism that emerged encouraged the art of satire. All the major poets of the period, Samuel Butler, John Dryden, Alexander Pope and Samuel Johnson, and the Irish poet Jonathan Swift, wrote satirical verse. Their satire was often written in defence of public order and the established church and government. However, writers such as Pope used their gift for satire to create scathing works responding to their detractors or to criticise what they saw as social atrocities perpetrated by the government. Pope's The Dunciad is a satirical slaying of two of his literary adversaries (Lewis Theobald, and Colley Cibber in a later version), expressing the view that British society was falling apart morally, culturally, and intellectually.

=== 18th-century classicism ===
The 18th century is sometimes called the Augustan age, and contemporary admiration for the classical world extended to the poetry of the time. Not only did the poets aim for a polished high style in emulation of the Roman ideal, they also translated and imitated Greek and Latin verse resulting in measured rationalised elegant verse. Dryden translated all the known works of Virgil, and Pope produced versions of the two Homeric epics. Horace and Juvenal were also widely translated and imitated, Horace most famously by John Wilmot, Earl of Rochester and Juvenal by Samuel Johnson's The Vanity of Human Wishes.

=== Women poets in the 18th century ===
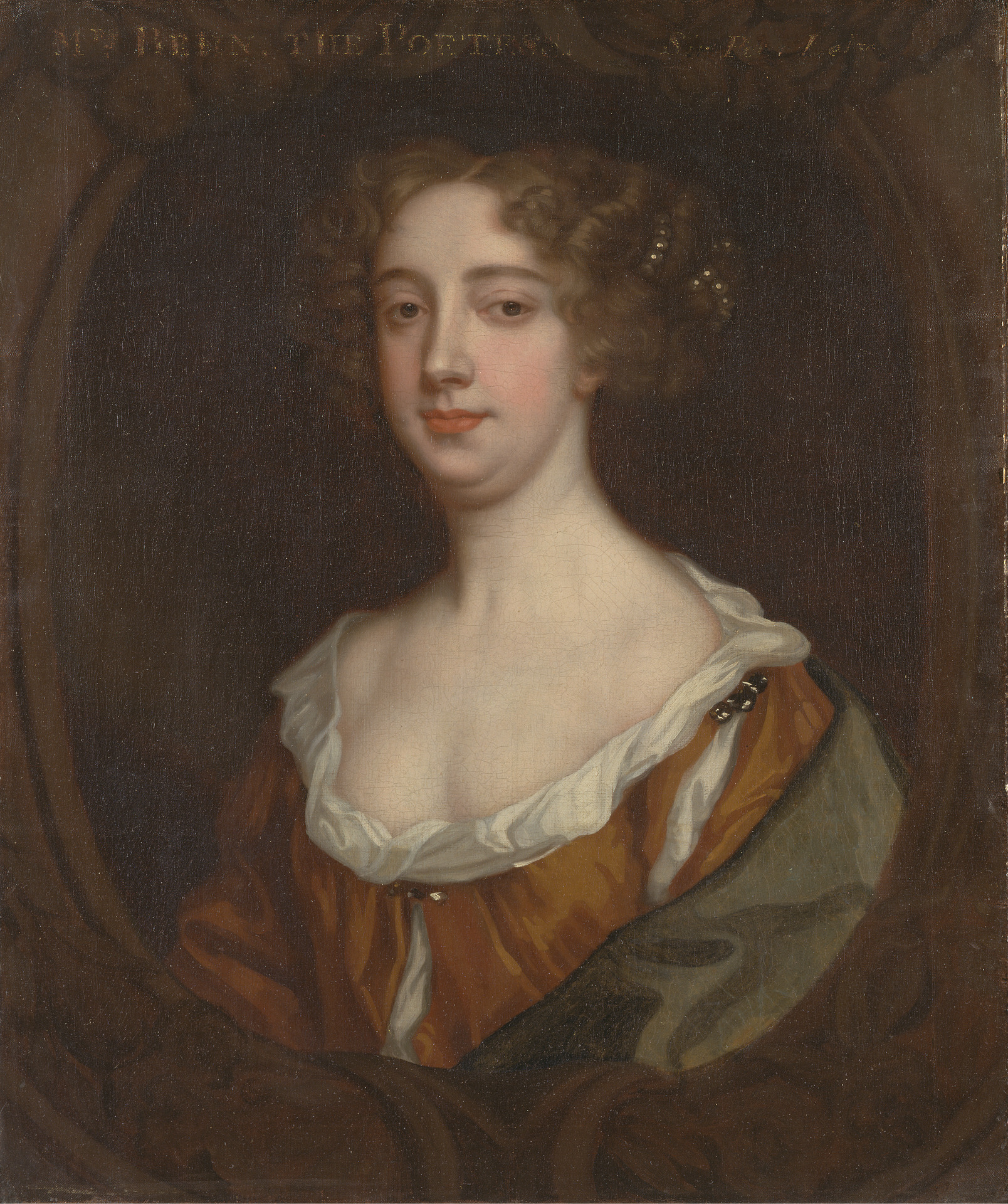
Aphra Behn

A number of women poets of note emerged during the period of the Restoration, including Aphra Behn, Margaret Cavendish, Mary Chudleigh, Anne Finch, Anne Killigrew, and Katherine Philips. Nevertheless, print publication by women poets was still relatively scarce when compared to that of men, though manuscript evidence indicates that many more women poets were practising than was previously thought. Disapproval of feminine "forwardness", however, kept many out of print in the early part of the period, and even as the century progressed women authors still felt the need to justify their incursions into the public sphere by claiming economic necessity or the pressure of friends. Women writers were increasingly active in all genres throughout the 18th century, and by the 1790s women's poetry was flourishing. Notable poets later in the period include Anna Laetitia Barbauld, Joanna Baillie, Susanna Blamire, Felicia Hemans, Mary Leapor, Lady Mary Wortley Montagu, Hannah More, and Mary Robinson. In the past decades there has been substantial scholarly and critical work done on women poets of the long 18th century: first, to reclaim them and make them available in contemporary editions in print or online, and second, to assess them and position them within a literary tradition.

=== The late 18th century ===
Towards the end of the 18th century, poetry began to move away from the strict Augustan ideals and a new emphasis on the sentiment and feelings of the poet was established. This trend can perhaps be most clearly seen in the handling of nature, with a move away from poems about formal gardens and landscapes by urban poets and towards poems about nature as lived in. The leading exponents of this new trend include Thomas Gray, George Crabbe, Christopher Smart and Robert Burns as well as the Irish poet Oliver Goldsmith. These poets can be seen as paving the way for the Romantic movement.

== The Romantic movement ==
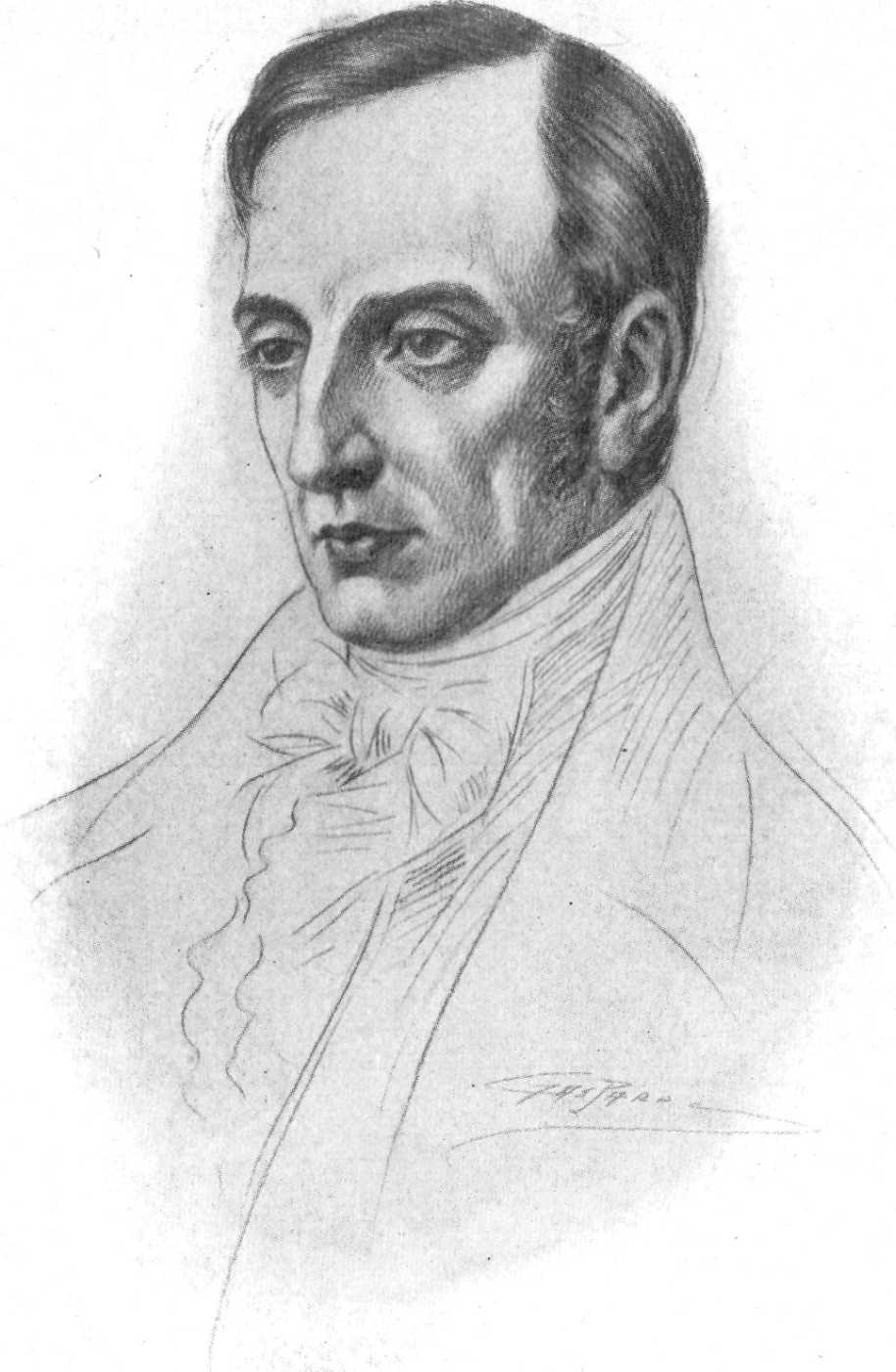
William Wordsworth

The last quarter of the 18th century was a time of social and political turbulence, with revolutions in the United States, France, Ireland and elsewhere. In Great Britain, movement for social change and a more inclusive sharing of power was also growing. This was the backdrop against which the Romantic movement in English poetry emerged.

The main poets of this movement were William Blake, William Wordsworth, Samuel Taylor Coleridge, Percy Bysshe Shelley, Lord Byron, and John Keats. The birth of English Romanticism is often dated to the publication in 1798 of Wordsworth and Coleridge's Lyrical Ballads. However, Blake had been publishing since the early 1780s. Much of the focus on Blake only came about during the last century when Northrop Frye discussed his work in his book Anatomy of Criticism. Shelley is most famous for such classic anthology verse works as Ozymandias, and long visionary poems which include Prometheus Unbound. Shelley's groundbreaking poem The Masque of Anarchy calls for nonviolence in protest and political action. It is perhaps the first modern statement of the principle of nonviolent protest. Mahatma Gandhi's passive resistance was influenced and inspired by Shelley's verse, and would often quote the poem to vast audiences.

In poetry, the Romantic movement emphasised the creative expression of the individual and the need to find and formulate new forms of expression. The Romantics, with the partial exception of Byron, rejected the poetic ideals of the 18th century, and each of them returned to Milton for inspiration, though each drew something different from Milton. They also put a good deal of stress on their own originality.

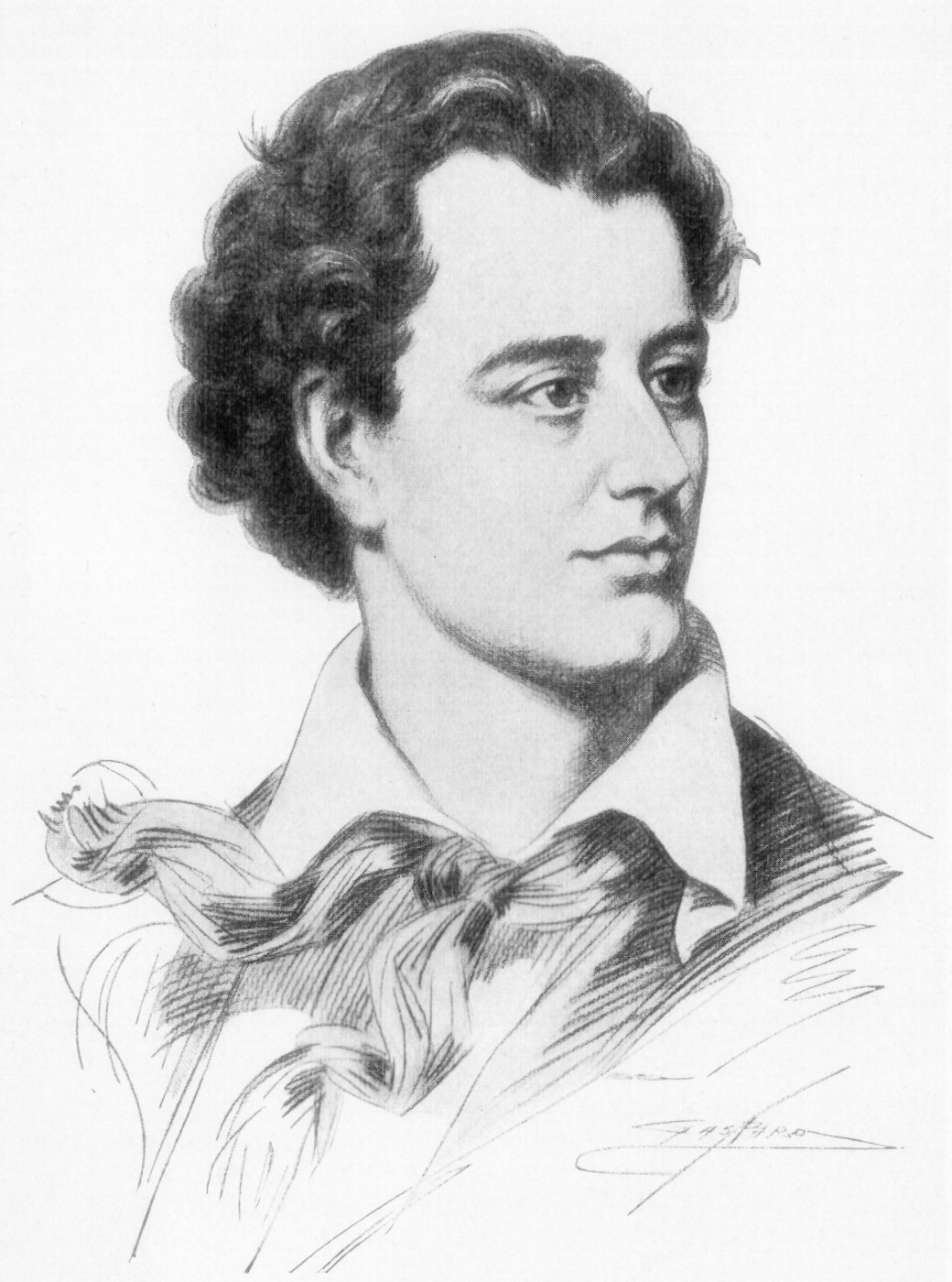
Lord Byron

To the Romantics, the moment of creation was the most important in poetic expression and could not be repeated once it passed. Because of this new emphasis, poems that were not complete were nonetheless included in a poet's body of work (such as Coleridge's "Kubla Khan" and "Christabel"). This argument has, however, been challenged in Zachary Leader's study Revision and Romantic Authorship (1996).

Additionally, the Romantic movement marked a shift in the use of language. Attempting to express the "language of the common man", Wordsworth and his fellow Romantic poets focused on employing poetic language for a wider audience, countering the mimetic, tightly constrained Neo-Classic poems (although it's important to note that the poet wrote first and foremost for his/her own creative expression). In Shelley's "Defense of Poetry", he contends that poets are the "creators of language" and that the poet's job is to refresh language for their society.

The Romantics were not the only poets of note at this time. In the work of John Clare the late Augustan voice is blended with a peasant's first-hand knowledge to produce arguably some of the finest nature poetry in the English language. Another contemporary poet who does not fit into the Romantic group was Walter Savage Landor. Landor was a classicist whose poetry forms a link between the Augustans and Robert Browning, who much admired it.

== Victorian poetry ==
The Victorian era was a period of great political, social and economic change. The Empire recovered from the loss of the American colonies and entered a period of rapid expansion. This expansion, combined with increasing industrialisation and mechanisation, led to a prolonged period of economic growth. The Reform Act 1832 was the beginning of a process that would eventually lead to universal suffrage.

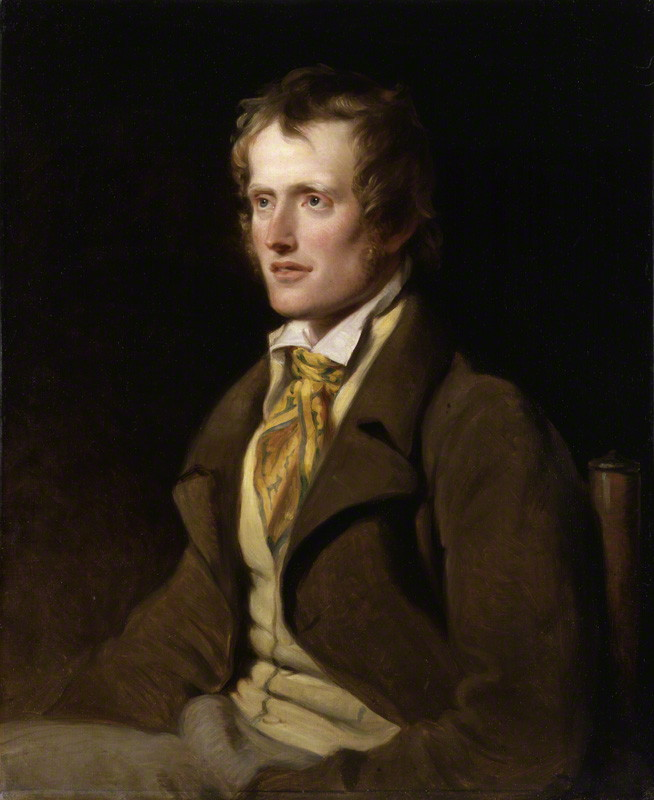
John Clare

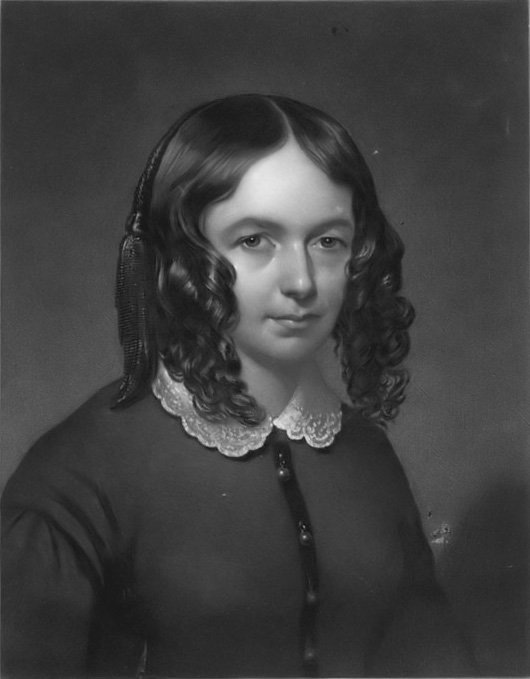
Elizabeth Barrett Browning

The major Victorian poets were John Clare, Alfred, Lord Tennyson, Robert Browning, Elizabeth Barrett Browning, Matthew Arnold, Christina Rossetti, Dante Gabriel Rossetti, Robert Louis Stevenson, Oscar Wilde, William Butler Yeats, Rudyard Kipling, Thomas Hardy, and Gerard Manley Hopkins, though Hopkins was not published until 1918.

John Clare came to be known for his celebratory representations of the English countryside and his lamentation of its disruption. His biographer Jonathan Bate states that Clare was "the greatest labouring-class poet that England has ever produced. No one has ever written more powerfully of nature, of a rural childhood, and of the alienated and unstable self".

Tennyson was, to some degree, the Spenser of the new age and his Idylls of the Kings can be read as a Victorian version of The Faerie Queen, that is as a poem that sets out to provide a mythic foundation to the idea of empire.

The Brownings spent much of their time out of England and explored European models and matter in much of their poetry. Robert Browning's great innovation was the dramatic monologue, which he used to its full extent in his long novel in verse, The Ring and the Book. Elizabeth Barrett Browning is perhaps best remembered for Sonnets from the Portuguese but her long poem Aurora Leigh is one of the classics of 19th century feminist literature.

Matthew Arnold was much influenced by Wordsworth, though his poem Dover Beach is often considered a precursor of the modernist revolution. Hopkins wrote in relative obscurity and his work was not published until after his death. His unusual style (involving what he called "sprung rhythm" and heavy reliance on rhyme and alliteration) had a considerable influence on many of the poets of the 1940s.

=== Pre-Raphaelites ===
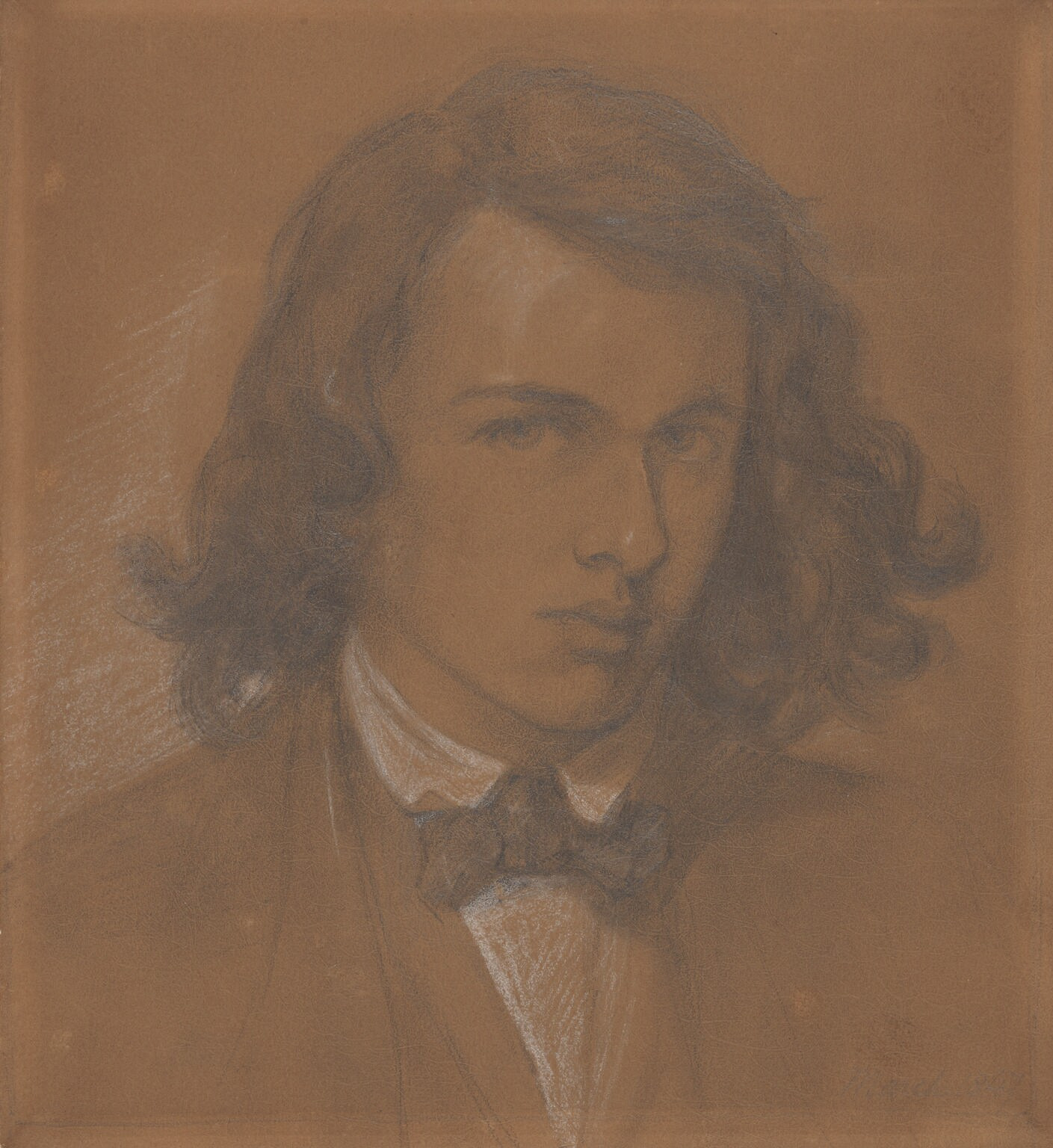
Dante Gabriel Rossetti: selfportrait

The Pre-Raphaelite Brotherhood was a mid-19th century arts movement dedicated to the reform of what they considered the sloppy Mannerist painting of the day. Although primarily concerned with the visual arts, a member of the inner circle, Dante Gabriel Rossetti was a poet of some ability, whilst his sister Christina Rossetti is generally considered a greater poet, whose contribution to Victorian Poetry is of a standard equal to that of Elizabeth Barrett Browning. The Rossettis' poetry shares many of the concerns of the Pre-Raphaelite movement: an interest in Medieval models, an almost obsessive attention to visual detail and an occasional tendency to lapse into whimsy.

Dante Rossetti worked with, and had some influence on, the leading arts and crafts painter and poet William Morris. Morris shared the Pre-Raphaelite interest in the poetry of the European Middle Ages, to the point of producing some illuminated manuscript volumes of his work.

=== 1890s: fin-de-siècle ===
Towards the end of the century, English poets began to take an interest in French symbolism and Victorian poetry entered a decadent fin de siècle phase. Two groups of poets emerged, the Yellow Book poets who adhered to the tenets of Aestheticism, including Algernon Charles Swinburne, Oscar Wilde and Arthur Symons and the Rhymers' Club group that included Ernest Dowson, Lionel Johnson and William Butler Yeats.

=== Comic verse ===
Comic verse abounded in the Victorian era. Magazines such as Punch and Fun magazine teemed with humorous invention and were aimed at a well-educated readership. The most famous collection of Victorian comic verse is the Bab Ballads.

== The 20th century ==
=== The first three decades ===
The Victorian era continued into the early years of the 20th century and two figures emerged as the leading representative of the poetry of the old era to act as a bridge into the new. These were Yeats and Thomas Hardy. Yeats, although not a modernist, was to learn a lot from the new poetic movements that sprang up around him and adapted his writing to the new circumstances. Hardy was, in terms of technique at least, a more traditional figure and was to be a reference point for various anti-modernist reactions, especially from the 1950s onwards.

A. E. Housman (1859 – 1936) was poet who was born in the Victorian era and who first published in the 1890s, but who only really became known in the 20th century. Housman is best known for his cycle of poems A Shropshire Lad (1896). This collection was turned down by several publishers so that Housman published it himself, and the work only became popular when "the advent of war, first in the Boer War and then in World War I, gave the book widespread appeal due to its nostalgic depiction of brave English soldiers". The poems' wistful evocation of doomed youth in the English countryside, in spare language and distinctive imagery, appealed strongly to late Victorian and Edwardian taste, and the fact that several early 20th-century composers set it to music helped its popularity. Housman published a further highly successful collection Last Poems in 1922 while a third volume, More Poems, was published posthumously in 1936.

==== The Georgian poets and World War I ====
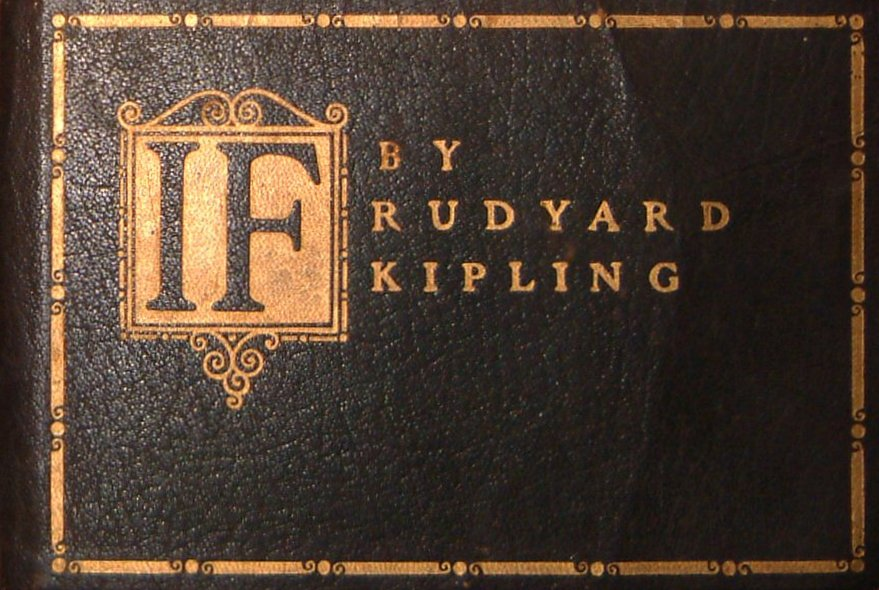
Rudyard Kipling's If— (1895), often voted Britain's favourite poem

The Georgian poets were the first major grouping of the post-Victorian era. Their work appeared in a series of five anthologies called Georgian Poetry which were published by Harold Monro and edited by Edward Marsh. The poets featured included Edmund Blunden, Rupert Brooke, Robert Graves, D. H. Lawrence, Walter de la Mare and Siegfried Sassoon. Their poetry represented something of a reaction to the decadence of the 1890s and tended towards the sentimental.

Brooke and Sassoon were to go on to win reputations as war poets and Lawrence quickly distanced himself from the group and was associated with the modernist movement. Graves distanced himself from the group as well and wrote poetry in accordance with a belief in a prehistoric muse he described as The White Goddess. Other notable poets who wrote about the war include Isaac Rosenberg, Edward Thomas, Wilfred Owen, May Cannan and, from the home front, Thomas Hardy and Rudyard Kipling. Kipling is the author of the famous inspirational poem If—, which is an evocation of Victorian stoicism, as a traditional British virtue. Although many of these poets wrote socially-aware criticism of the war, most remained technically conservative and traditionalist.

==== Modernism ====
Imagism is considered to be the first organized modernist literary movement in the English language. This was an early, 20th-century, Anglo-American, modernist, poetry movement that favoured precision of imagery and clear, sharp language, that marked the beginning of a revolution in the way poetry was written. English poets involved with this group included Ezra Pound, D. H. Lawrence, Richard Aldington, T. E. Hulme, F. S. Flint, Ford Madox Ford, Allen Upward and John Cournos.

A leading figure in British modernism, influenced by imagism was American born T. S. Eliot, who moved to Britain in 1914, where he published in 1922 The Waste Land and became a citizen in 1927. Other English modernists include the London-Welsh poet and painter David Jones, whose first book, In Parenthesis, was one of the very few experimental poems to come out of World War I, the Scot Hugh MacDiarmid, Mina Loy and Basil Bunting.

=== The Thirties ===
The poets who began to emerge in the 1930s had two things in common; they had all been born too late to have any real experience of the pre-World War I world and they grew up in a period of social, economic and political turmoil. Perhaps as a consequence of these facts, themes of community, social (in)justice and war seem to dominate the poetry of the decade.

The poetic space of the decade was dominated by four poets; W. H. Auden, Stephen Spender, Cecil Day-Lewis and Louis MacNeice, although the last of these belongs at least as much to the history of Irish poetry. These poets were all, in their early days at least, politically active on the Left. Although they admired Eliot, they also represented a move away from the technical innovations of their modernist predecessors. A number of other, less enduring, poets also worked in the same vein. One of these was Michael Roberts, whose New Country anthology both introduced the group to a wider audience and gave them their name.

The 1930s also saw the emergence of a home-grown English surrealist poetry whose main exponents were David Gascoyne, Hugh Sykes Davies, George Barker, and Philip O'Connor. These poets turned to French models rather than either the New Country poets or English-language modernism, and their works were a proof of the importance of later English experimental poets as it broadened the scope of the English avant-garde tradition.

John Betjeman and Stevie Smith, who were two other significant poets of this period, who stood outside all schools and groups. Betjeman was a quietly ironic poet of Middle England, with a command of a wide range of verse techniques. Smith was an entirely unclassifiable one-off voice.

=== The Forties ===
The 1940s opened with the United Kingdom at war and a new generation of war poets emerged in response. These included Keith Douglas, Alun Lewis, Henry Reed and F. T. Prince. As with the poets of the First World War, the work of these writers can be seen as something of an interlude in the history of 20th century poetry. Technically, many of these war poets owed something to the 1930s poets, but their work grew out of the particular circumstances in which they found themselves living and fighting.

The main movement in post-war 1940s contemporary poetry was the New Romantic group that included Dylan Thomas, George Barker, W. S. Graham, Kathleen Raine, Henry Treece and J. F. Hendry. These writers saw themselves as in revolt against the classicism of the New Country poets. They turned to such models as Gerard Manley Hopkins, Arthur Rimbaud and Hart Crane and the word play of James Joyce. Thomas, in particular, helped Anglo-Welsh poetry to emerge as a recognisable force.

Other significant poets to emerge in the 1940s include Lawrence Durrell, Bernard Spencer, Roy Fuller, Norman Nicholson, Vernon Watkins, R. S. Thomas and Norman MacCaig. These last four poets represent a trend towards regionalism and poets writing about their native areas; Watkins and Thomas in Wales, Nicholson in Cumberland and MacCaig in Scotland.

=== The Fifties ===
The 1950s were dominated by three groups of poets, The Movement, The Group, and poets clarified by the term Extremist Art, which was first used by the poet A. Alvarez to describe the work of the American poet Sylvia Plath.

The Movement poets as a group came to public notice in Robert Conquest's 1955 anthology New Lines. The core of the group consisted of Philip Larkin, Elizabeth Jennings, D. J. Enright, Kingsley Amis, Thom Gunn and Donald Davie. They were identified with a hostility to modernism and internationalism, and looked to Hardy as a model. However, both Davie and Gunn later moved away from this position.

As befits their name, the Group were much more formally a group of poets, meeting for weekly discussions under the chairmanship of Philip Hobsbaum and Edward Lucie-Smith. Other Group poets included Martin Bell, Peter Porter, Peter Redgrove, George MacBeth and David Wevill. Hobsbaum spent some time teaching in Belfast, where he was a formative influence on the emerging Northern Ireland poets including Seamus Heaney.

Other poets associated with Extremist Art included Plath's one-time husband Ted Hughes, Francis Berry and Jon Silkin. These poets are sometimes compared with the Expressionist German school.

A number of young poets working in what might be termed a modernist vein also started publishing during this decade. These included Charles Tomlinson, Gael Turnbull, Roy Fisher and Bob Cobbing. These poets can now be seen as forerunners of some of the major developments during the following two decades.

=== The 1960s and 1970s ===
In the early part of the 1960s, the centre of gravity of mainstream poetry moved to Northern Ireland, with the emergence of Seamus Heaney, Tom Paulin, Paul Muldoon and others. In England, the most cohesive groupings can, in retrospect, be seen to cluster around what might loosely be called the modernist tradition and draw on American as well as indigenous models.

The British Poetry Revival was a late 1960s and early 1970s wide-reaching collection of groupings and subgroupings that embraces performance, sound and concrete poetry as well as the legacy of Pound, Jones, MacDiarmid, Loy and Bunting, the Objectivist poets, the Beats and the Black Mountain poets, among others. Leading poets associated with this movement include J. H. Prynne, Eric Mottram, Tom Raworth, Denise Riley and Lee Harwood.

The Mersey Beat poets were Adrian Henri, Brian Patten and Roger McGough. Their work was a self-conscious attempt at creating an English equivalent to the Beats. Many of their poems were written in protest against the established social order and, particularly, the threat of nuclear war. Although not actually a Mersey Beat poet, Adrian Mitchell is often associated with the group in critical discussion. Contemporary poet Steve Turner has also been compared with them.

== 1980s and after ==
Geoffrey Hill, who died in 2016, has been considered to be among the most distinguished poets of his generation.". Hill was first published in the 1950s. The last three decades of the 20th century saw a number of short-lived poetic groupings, including the Martians, along with a general trend towards what has been termed 'Poeclectics', namely an intensification within individual poets' oeuvres of "all kinds of style, subject, voice, register and form". There continued, crucially, an increased interest in women's writing, and in poetry from England's minorities (especially the West Indian community). Another important aspect of the 1980s and 1990s was the birth of key seminal poet-led organisations such as Torriano and Blue Nose Poets/writers inc. which, together, played a major role in establishing and disseminating the norms and etiquettes of grass-roots poetry workshops and readings one finds throughout the UK poetry scene today. Performance poetry including poetry slam continued to expand too, and are still active. Some poets who emerged in this period include Carol Ann Duffy, Andrew Motion, Craig Raine, Wendy Cope, James Fenton, Blake Morrison, Liz Lochhead, George Szirtes, Linton Kwesi Johnson, Benjamin Zephaniah. Mark Ford is an example of a poet influenced by the New York School.

Bloodaxe Books' The New Poetry, published in 1993, included Simon Armitage, Kathleen Jamie, Glyn Maxwell, Selima Hill, Maggie Hannan, Michael Hofmann and Peter Reading. The New Generation movement of the 1990s and early 2000s, included Don Paterson, Julia Copus, John Stammers, Jacob Polley, David Morley and Alice Oswald. A new generation of innovative poets has also sprung up in the wake of the British Poetry Revival movement of the 1960s and 1970s, notably Caroline Bergvall, Tony Lopez, Allen Fisher and Denise Riley. Throughout this period, publishing initiatives such as Salt Publishing and Shearsman Books promoted poetic diversity, while independent poetry presses such as Cinnamon press and Enitharmon Press have made available original work from (among others) Dannie Abse, whose first collection was published in 1948, Martyn Crucefix, Jane Duran, first collection 1995, U. A. Fanthorpe, whose career began in the 1980s, Mario Petrucci, first collection 1996, and Kathleen Raine, first published in 1943.

== See also ==
- English literature
- British literature
- Imagism
- Irish poetry
- List of years in poetry
- Modernist poetry
- New Oxford Book of English Verse 1250–1950
- Poets' Corner
- Scottish literature
- Welsh literature in English

== Bibliography ==
- Burrow, Colin (2004). "Wyatt, Sir Thomas (c. 1503-1542), poet and ambassador". Oxford dictionary of national biography. Oxford New York: Oxford University Press. ISBN 978-0-19-861412-8.
- Dalglish, Jack, ed. (1961). Eight Metaphysical Poets. Oxford: Heinemann. ISBN 0-435-15031-6.
- Greene, Roland; et al., eds. (2012). "Poetry of England". The Princeton Encyclopedia of Poetry and Poetics (4th rev. ed.). Princeton, NJ: Princeton University Press. pp. 420–428. ISBN 978-0-691-15491-6.
- Hamilton, Ian. The Oxford Companion to Twentieth-Century Poetry in English
- Tillyard, E M W (1929), The poetry of Sir Thomas Wyatt : a selection and study, London: Scholartis Press, OCLC 629799234
- Ward, A. W.; Waller, A. R., eds. (1907–1916). The Cambridge History of English Literature. Vol. 1–14. Cambridge: Cambridge University Press.
- Ward, AW; Waller, AR; Trent, WP; Erskine, J; Sherman, SP; Van Doren, C, eds. (1907–21), History of English and American literature, New York: GP Putnam’s Sons University Press.
