= Huchoun =

Scottish 14th century poet

Huchoun ("little Hugh"), Huchown or Huchowne "of the Awle Ryale" (fl. 14th century) is a poet conjectured to have been writing sometime in the 14th century. Some academics, following the Scottish antiquarian George Neilson (1858–1923), have identified him with a Scottish knight, Hugh of Eglinton, and advanced his authorship of several significant pieces of alliterative verse. Current opinion is that there is little evidence to support this.

== Evidence ==
The little that is known about Huchoun comes from the Chronicle of Andrew of Wyntoun, which mentions:

Hucheon,
þat cunnande was in littratur.
He made a gret Gest of Arthure
And þe Awntyr of Gawane,
Þe Pistil als of Suet Susane.
He was curyousse in his stille,
Fayr of facunde and subtile,
And ay to pleyssance hade delyte,
Mad in metyr meit his dyte
Litil or noucht neuir þe lesse
Wauerande fra þe suythfastnes.

(Cotton Manuscript book V. II, 4308-4318).

Interest in the otherwise unknown figure of "Huchoun" - a diminutive form of "Hugh", i.e. "little Hugh" - was spurred largely by the work of George Neilson, a lawyer and antiquarian, who gave a series of lectures at Glasgow University in 1902 centred on the subject, and published a book the same year.

Of the works Andrew of Wyntoun mentions, the easiest to identify was Þe Pistil als of Suet Susane. This has been fairly firmly associated with The Pistel of Swete Susan, an alliterative poem surviving in 5 manuscripts.

The Gest of Arthure, also called Gest Historyalle and described by Wyntoun, has been more tentatively identified as the well-known Alliterative Morte Arthure (found in the Thornton manuscript of Lincoln Cathedral).

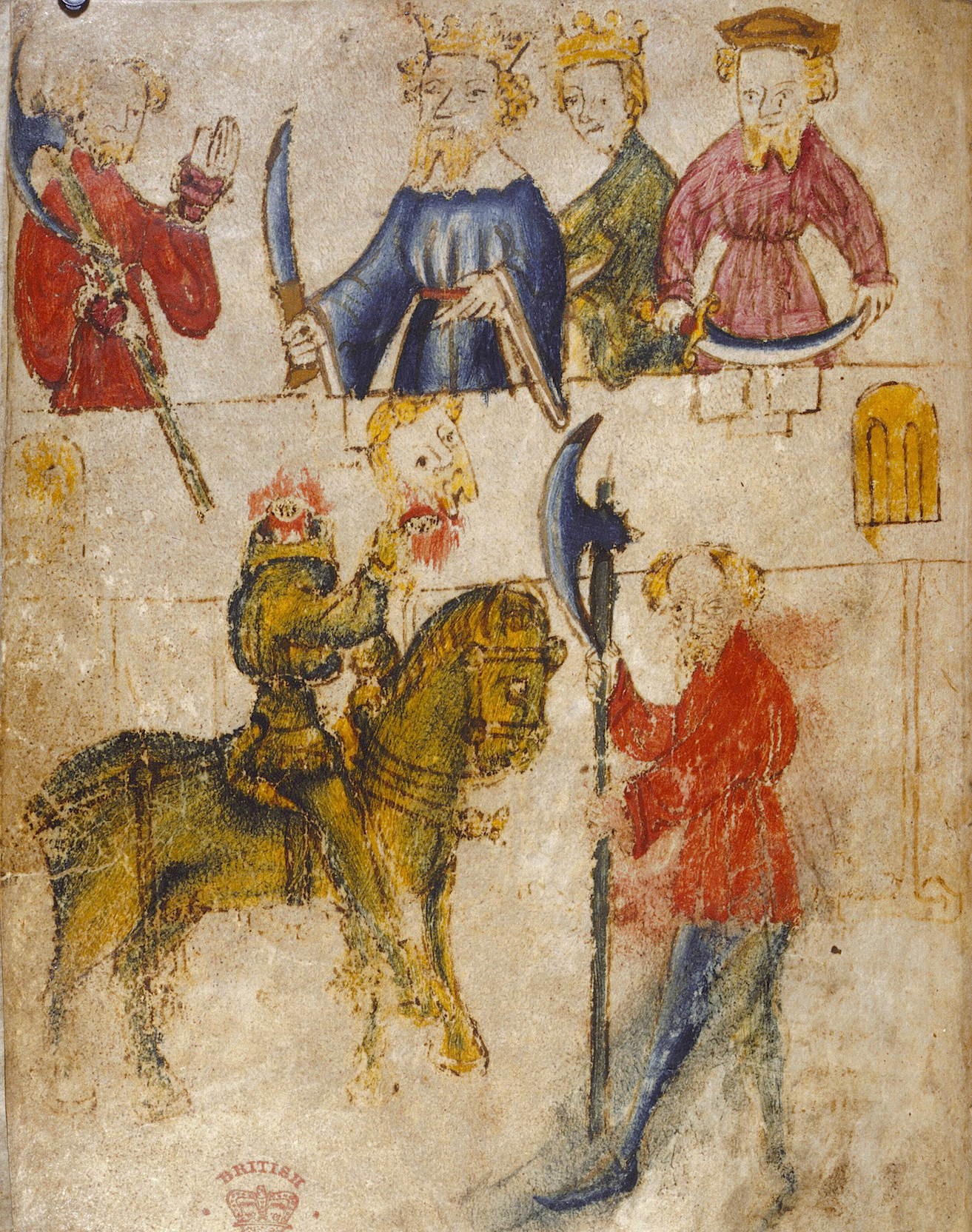
Illustration from Cotton Nero A.x. the sole manuscript to contain the poem Sir Gawain and the Green Knight. Neilson attributed this poem, probably incorrectly, to Huchoun.

The Awntyr of Gawane (literally the "Adventure of Gawain") is less certain. Neilson advanced that it represented the great alliterative work Sir Gawain and the Green Knight and Huchoun was therefore also credited with Patience, Pearl, and Cleanness. The fact that a later hand had written "Hugo de" at the head of the manuscript of these works was also taken as supporting evidence. The output of the Pearl Poet, however, is linguistically very distinct from what seems to be the oldest versions of the works more solidly attributed to Huchoun, and this attribution is nowadays dismissed. More likely is the suggestion that the Awntyr of Gawane represents The Awntyrs off Arthure, an Arthurian poem in a rhymed alliterative stanza similar to Swete Susan, which has several variants in multiple manuscripts.

== Identity ==
Beyond the matter of what he may have written, who Huchoun was is uncertain.

William Dunbar, in his Lament for the Makaris, mentions a poet called "gude Sir Hew of Eglyntoun", whose works are now lost. Hugh of Eglington was a knight who was brother-in-law to Robert II of Scotland. Following suggestions made by earlier antiquarians, Neilson argued that Huchoun, "little Hugh", could be the same figure: given Hugh of Eglington's close connection with the king, and the fact that he was given safe conduct to visit London, the epithet "of the Awle Ryale" could be explained, if it was interpreted as "Aula Regalis" or "Royal Palace".

The biggest problem with this identification is that the poems ascribed by Neilson to Huchoun / Hugh of Eglington are of varying dialects, none of them Scottish. Even the poem most likely to be authentically Huchoun's own work, the Pistel of Swete Susan, seems to be in a north Yorkshire dialect overlaying a Midland source. Gawain and the Green Knight and the other three poems in the Cotton Nero A.x manuscript have a clearly north-western provenance, while the Alliterative Morte Arthure is considered to originate in the East Midlands. Two possibilities suggested by Neilson are that a Scottish poet wrote in a southern dialect, perhaps after being educated in England, or that the Scotticisms were "translated" by later scribes. It seems a more likely suggestion either that Andrew of Wyntoun's poet, Huchoun, was not Scottish (and therefore not Sir Hugh), or that the poems he mentions were in fact other works now lost, rather than the great alliterative poems Neilson claimed they referred to.

Other candidates for Huchoun from different parts of England have much less detailed evidence to prove their case. Current academic opinion takes the line that Huchoun, if he existed, may have written swete Susan but that evidence to link the same poet to other major alliterative works is tenuous at best.
