= Alliterative Revival =

Middle English poetic trend (c. 1350–1500)

The Alliterative Revival is a term adopted by literary historians to refer to the resurgence of poetry using the alliterative verse form in Middle English between c. 1350 and 1500. Alliterative verse was the traditional verse form of Old English poetry; the last known alliterative poem prior to the Revival was Layamon's Brut, which dates from around 1190.

Scholarly opinion has been divided on whether the Alliterative Revival represented a conscious revival of an old artistic tradition, or merely signified that despite the tradition continuing in some form between 1200 and 1350, no poems survived in written form. Major works of the Revival include William Langland's Piers Plowman, the Alliterative Morte Arthure, and the works of the Gawain Poet: Pearl, Sir Gawain and the Green Knight, Cleanness, and Patience.

== History of academic recognition of the Revival ==
It was not until the later 19th century that editors began to consider the problems caused by the chronology of surviving medieval alliterative verse. Although he offered no comment himself, the work of Walter William Skeat made it apparent to students for the first time that there was a gap during the 13th and 14th centuries when no verse was written using an alliterative stave. By 1889 the philologist ten Brink spoke of a "revival of alliterative poetry" in the later 14th century, and the term was in routine use by the early 20th century.

The concept was further developed by scholars such as Israel Gollancz, James R. Hulbert, and J. P. Oakden. Their work developed a regionally based, nativist formulation of alliterative poetry which argued it expressed selfconsciously 'English' and archaic modes, revived from previous centuries, in opposition to the modern French-influenced court poetry of the south and east of England.

While the arguments of Gollancz and early 20th century academics strongly supposed continuity between Old English verse forms and those of the Revival, academics of the 1960s and 70s increasingly began to stress the discontinuities in the forms, suggesting that 14th century alliterative verse was a purely new invention. Writers such as Elizabeth Salter, David Lawton and Thorlac Turville-Petre notably refused to hypothesise the existence of poetry that had not survived in the written record, preferring instead to seek possible inspiration for the Revival's poetry within rhythmic prose traditions of the 13th and 14th century.

== Verse ==
=== Alliterative "long line" ===
The rules by which alliterative verse was composed in Middle English are unclear and have been the subject of much debate. No metrical rules were written down at the time, and their details were quickly forgotten once the form died out: Robert Crowley, in his 1550 printing of Piers Plowman, simply stated that each line had "thre wordes at the least [...] whiche beginne with some one letter", assuring readers that "this thinge noted, the miter shal be very plesaunt to read".

Verse of the Alliterative Revival broadly adheres to the same pattern shown in Old English poetry; a four-stress line, with a rhythmic pause (or caesura) in the middle, in which three of the stresses alliterate, i.e. in the pattern AA AX. However, there are very significant differences. Amongst the features differentiating the Middle English alliterative style from its predecessor is that the lines are longer and looser in rhythm, and the medial pause is less strictly observed, or often absent entirely; hundreds of rhythmic variations seem to have been permitted. While Old English poetry generally employed a clear syntactic break in the middle of the line, in Middle English the line is generally a complete syntactic unit: some poets composed sentences extending over several lines. An example of this style is shown by a few lines from Wynnere and Wastoure:

Whylome were lordes in londe that loved in thaire hertis
To here makers of myrthes that matirs couthe fynde,
And now es no frenchipe in fere bot fayntnesse of hert,
Wyse wordes withinn that wroghte were never,
Ne redde in no romance that ever renke herde.(19-23)

There has been much debate on the subject of how lines containing more than two alliterating syllables before the medial pause, which are common in verse of the Revival, should be read. While some scholars have described these additional syllables as a "minor chief syllable" or as having "secondary stress", they have also been interpreted as not altering the four-stress pattern while still contributing to the effect of the line. Some of the most recent analysis proposes that the traditional four-stress model of both Old English and Middle English alliterative verse is a "misapprehension" and that a focus on other apparent rules clarifies the evolution of the form, with Layamon's Brut emerging as a key text in the development of alliterative verse.

=== Stanzaic poems ===
A second type of verse combining rhymed stanzas, usually of thirteen or occasionally fourteen lines, with the basic four-stress line also appeared during the Revival: it appears to have been a new development of the 14th century. Here the alliteration may often follow the pattern aa / aa, ax / aa, or even aa / bb, though lines with four alliterating words are much more common than in verse using the unrhymed long line.

Mirroring uncertainty over the evolution of alliterative verse in general, it is still uncertain as to whether this tradition developed from the unrhymed alliterative template or from rhymed verse forms on which the traditional alliterative stave was superimposed. While the poems in the thirteen-line stanza have generally been considered a part of the alliterative tradition, they have also been argued to be a related but distinct offshoot, incorporating elements of rhythm and metre that are in direct conflict with the conventions of unrhymed alliterative verse.

The surviving stanzaic alliterative poems are generally of northern English provenance; some, such as Somer Soneday or The Three Dead Kings, are of very complex form.

== Development of the Revival ==
The dialects shown in the surviving poems often point towards a northern and western provenance. The traditional interpretation of the Revival argues that such verse first began to be produced in the south-west Midlands, perhaps towards the start of the 14th century, and spread gradually northwards and eastwards, eventually becoming limited to the far north and Scotland by the close of the 15th century. This view suggests that the Revival was a largely self-contained movement whose "contacts with the metropolitan, Chaucerian tradition were slight". The words of the Parson in the prologue to Chaucer's Parson's Tale, that as a "Southren man" he cannot recite alliterative verse - "I kan nat geeste 'rum, ram, ruf' by lettre" - have often been taken as supporting evidence that alliterative verse was associated only with the north of the country.

In more recent years medievalists have begun to challenge the idea that alliterative verse and its "revival" was an exclusively regional phenomenon, limited to the north and west of England. Although, as academic Ralph Hanna observes, the records of early alliterative poetry cluster overwhelmingly around the literary communities of Worcester, in the west, and York, in the north, alliterative poetry at least subsequently developed "as one competing form of a national, not regional, literature". This view interprets alliterative verse as part of the common literary culture of the time: although it was most appreciated in the rural north-west, several poems seem to have a definitely eastern (and in the case of The Blacksmiths, possibly urban) origin. The apparent flowering of the alliterative style in the period may have been due to social changes occurring in the wake of the Black Death, which would have thrown vernacular literary styles into greater prominence, or may simply be the result of the fact that the fifteenth century saw a general uptick in the amount of English-language literature being composed and copied.

Ultimately, changing literary fashions, along with its perhaps old-fashioned and provincial associations, led to the abandonment of the alliterative form. Its use persisted in Scotland long after it had become a curiosity in an English literary culture totally dominated by the Chaucerian tradition: from 1450 until the following century, every major Scots court poet composed at least one alliterative poem. It is likely that the move of the court of James VI and I from Edinburgh to London in 1603 finally broke the continuous tradition of alliterative metre: its compositional rules were soon forgotten, following which it became "as inaccessible as a dead language".

== Audience and authors ==
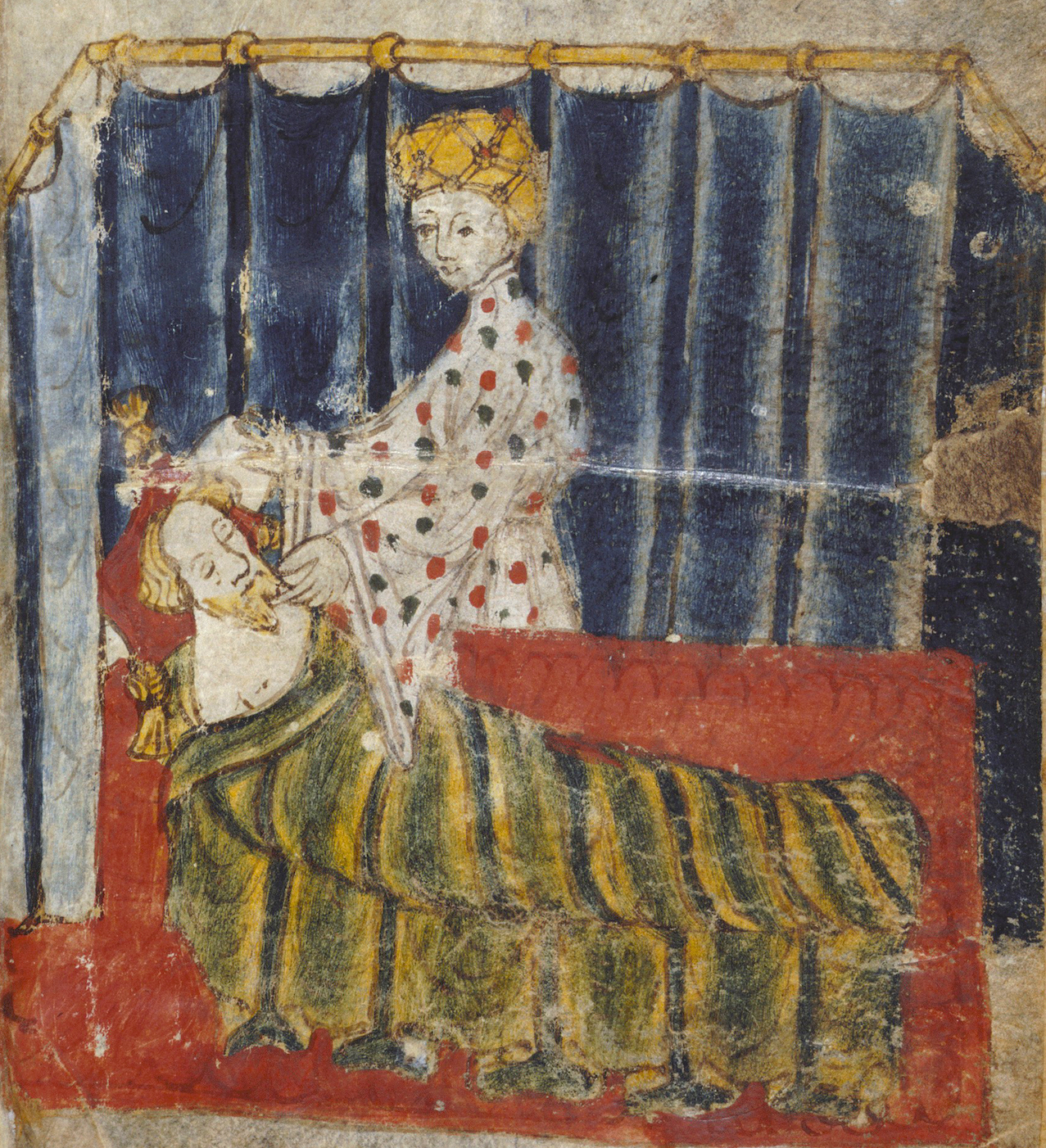
Gawain tempted by Sir Bertilak's wife: an illustration from the manuscript of Gawain and the Green Knight. Several authors of the Alliterative Revival chose to rework Arthurian stories

The cultural milieu of the alliterative poets is often described as one more provincial and backward-looking than that of Chaucerian, courtly poetry of the time, with the poems being appreciated by an audience drawn from the landed gentry of the shires rather than the urban sophisticates of the court. The Arthurian subjects of many Revival poems have sometimes been taken as evidence of the movement's provincial or antiquarian character or even of a form of English nationalism. Most of the authors use language closer to the vernacular, use archaic or dialect terms, and structure their work as if to be read aloud to a mixed group of listeners. A more recent interpretation suggests that these qualities are due to alliterative poetry's status as a popular mode closer to the vernacular, or to its tendency to preserve older linguistic forms through poetic formula and convention, rather than resulting from conscious antiquarianism or cultural chauvinism.

Several academics, beginning with James Hulbert, have suggested that the Revival's poets could have had a more noble audience, and were part of a conscious regional identity encouraged by powerful northern and western magnates – the Mortimer Earls of March, the Bohun Earls of Hereford and the Beauchamp Earls of Warwick – as a political counterweight to the court. However, as Richard II of England and John of Gaunt both had substantial support and connections in the north-west, it is equally possible to argue that the alliterative poets of this period could easily have had courtly connections.

In comparison to some of the authors of syllabic rhymed verse during this period, such as Geoffrey Chaucer, John Gower, and John Lydgate, almost nothing is known about the authors of alliterative poetry. The greatest of them, the Gawain Poet, author of Pearl and Sir Gawain and the Green Knight, and that of Alliterative Morte Arthure are both completely anonymous, though the former has been tentatively identified as a John Massey, member of a Cheshire landowning family. Even William Langland, the author of the hugely influential Piers Plowman, has been identified largely through conjecture. The longest poem of the Revival (over 14,000 lines), The Destruction of Troy, is ascribed to a John Clerk from Lancashire, but little else is known about him. A notable exception to this lack of information is Scottish court poet William Dunbar; Dunbar generally wrote in syllabic metres, but displays a masterful use of the alliterative line in one poem at the very end of the period.

One man known to have appreciated alliterative verse during the time it was still being composed was Robert Thornton, a 15th-century landowner from North Yorkshire. Thornton's efforts in copying these poems, for the use of himself and his family, resulted in the preservation of several valuable works.

== Chronology ==
The first alliterative poem after the Brut for which a date can be established is Wynnere and Wastoure, which from internal evidence is usually dated to around 1352, though the Alexander A and B fragments have been suggested to be as early as 1340. The last, Scottish Ffielde, was composed in c. 1515. From in between these dates, a number of examples of verse have survived, of which some are listed below:

- c. 1352
  - Wynnere and Wastoure, unrhymed allegorical debate (anonymous; dialect appears to point to a poet from north Cheshire)
- c. 1360, perhaps revised until the 1390s
  - Piers Plowman, very long allegorical and satirical dream vision (author conjecturally identified as William Langland, west or southwest Midland dialect)
- c. 1365, though later 14th century also suggested
  - The Alliterative Morte Arthure, unrhymed Arthurian romance (anonymous; probable dialect of east Midlands)
- c. 1370
  - The Parlement of the Thre Ages, unrhymed allegorical poem (anonymous, Midland dialect; some commentators have argued it may be written by the author of Wynnere and Wastoure)
  - The Siege of Jerusalem, religious-historical narrative (anonymous, Lancashire dialect; ca. 1370-1380 vengeance narrative that describes the Siege of Jerusalem (70 CE))
- c. 1380 (works attributed to the Gawain Poet)
  - Pearl, allegorical poem in rhymed stanza (anonymous; dialect of the Gawain Poet, sometimes identified as a John Massey, is of Cheshire / Staffordshire)
  - Sir Gawain and the Green Knight, Arthurian romance in unrhymed stanza with rhymed bob and wheel (anonymous; generally considered to be the work of the Gawain Poet, above)
  - Cleanness, homiletic poem in unrhymed verse (anonymous; generally considered to be the work of the Gawain Poet, above)
  - Patience, homiletic poem in unrhymed verse (anonymous; generally considered to be the work of the Gawain Poet, above)
- c. 1385
  - The Destruction of Troy, historical narrative by John Clerk of Whalley, Lancashire
- 1386
  - St. Erkenwald, saint's life / exemplum in unrhymed verse (anonymous; similar dialect to Gawain Poet has led to suggestion it may also be by this author)
- c. 1390
  - The Pistel of Swete Susan, biblical story in thirteen-line stanza (anonymous, south Yorkshire dialect; sometimes attributed to a "Huchoun", or "Hugh")
- c. 1400
  - The Three Dead Kings, moral poem in thirteen-line stanza that has been called the most technically complex in the language (anonymous; sometimes attributed to John Audelay)
  - Pater Noster, religious poem in rhymed alliterative stanza (anonymous; also possibly by Audelay)
- c. 1420
  - The Awntyrs off Arthure, Arthurian romance in thirteen-line stanza (anonymous; probably written by a native of Cumberland)
- c. 1425
  - The Blacksmiths, satirical complaint against the noise made by blacksmiths (anonymous; East Anglian or even London dialect)
- c. 1450
  - The Buke of the Howlat, Scottish allegorical poem in rhymed stanza with irregular alliteration; written by Richard Holland
- c. 1500
  - The Tretis of the Twa Mariit Wemen and the Wedo, satirical chanson d'aventure in unrhymed long line; written by Scottish poet William Dunbar
- c. 1515
  - Scottish Ffielde; anonymous poem about the Battle of Flodden, composed for the Stanley family.

Some elements of the alliterative technique survived in Scotland until the late 16th century, appearing in The Flyting Betwixt Montgomerie and Polwart dated around 1580.
