= John Massey (poet) =

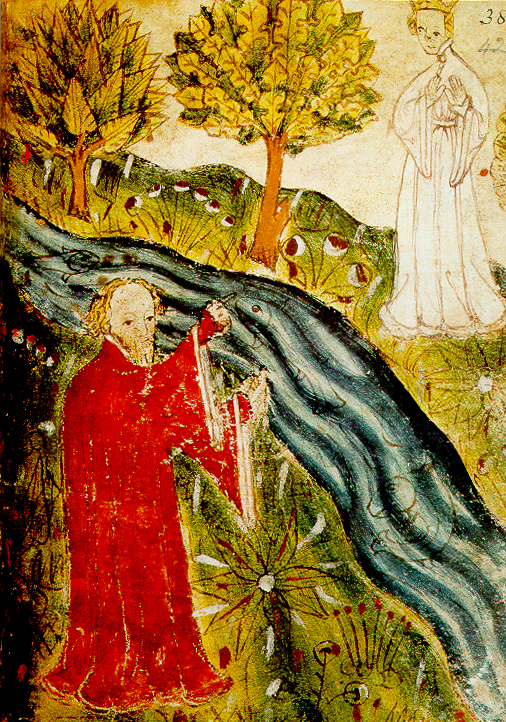
The Gawain Poet (fl. c.1375–1400)

John Massey is one conjectured name of the Gawain Poet, author of Sir Gawain and the Green Knight and probably of several other 14th-century Middle English poems. Internal evidence from the text of the poems and marginalia of the manuscript suggests the name "John Massey" or similar; contemporary records of people of the name who might have been poets include one from the village of Cotton in Cheshire.

== Theory of the authorship ==
The Gawain-poet is speculated to have written Sir Gawain and the Green Knight, Pearl, St. Erkenwald, and Patience.

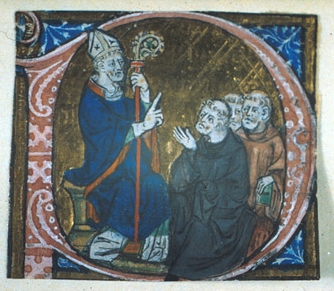
St Erkenwald, inspiration of one of the poems thought to be by the poet

The first hint pointing to Massey being the Gawain-poet is in the Margins of St. Erkenwald. In the margins, there are multiple references to the booth family of Dunham-Massey, more specifically a ‘Thomas Masse’. The spelling of the name was not standardized at this point, and many variations were used. This is theorized by C.J Peterson.

== Anagrams in Pearl ==
Though no one is sure that Massey was the author of Pearl and Sir Gawain and the Green Knight, some scholars contend that Massey was the author and used hidden messages to credit himself.

One example of this can be found by looking at repetitions in the stanzas of the poem, Pearl:

Since there are twenty sections in Pearl joined by linking words, we should expect 20 link-words. But this is not the case. There are only 18: more is used twice, in sections 3 and 10; and ryჳt, the last word of the section 12, has no link with section 13. Through this anomaly, attention is called to 12, the number of the broken-link stanza-group, and to 18, the number of link-words joining the stanza-groups together.

In the Latin alphabet as in use in English at that time, the 12th letter was M, and the 18th T, as I and J were seen as one, as well as U and V. This lends credence to the idea that the poet was a Thomas Massey, as in the margins of St. Erkenwald.

== John of Lancaster ==
Clifford Peterson has argued that Massey may have been a member of the household of John of Lancaster, son of King Henry IV. If Massey is the author of the Pearl, this means he would have had to be alive in the late end of the fourteenth century. John Massey of Cotton, a retainer in the house of Lancaster, may be the same J. Massey whose anagrams have been found in the Pearl and St. Erkenwald.

== Relation to Hoccleve and his Epistle ==
Massey is also suspected to have relations to Thomas Hoccleve, even possibly being mentioned in his epistle within the lines

"For rethorik hath his fro me the keye

Of his tresor, nat deyneth hir nobleye

Dele with noon so ignorant as me."

The poem goes on to mention more about Massey and his poetry and skill but nothing about his life outside of it. While connected to Massey, the poem never outright mentions a name, only saying that the person being written about has extreme talent in poetry and its devices. This also brings up the possibility of Massey being Mr. Turville-Petre's William Massey; whatever the case may be, Massey was mentioned (be it outright our otherwise) in the poem. The mention having nothing to do with class or rank, just the incredible ability of the poet himself.
