= Gawain Poet =

Unknown medieval poet

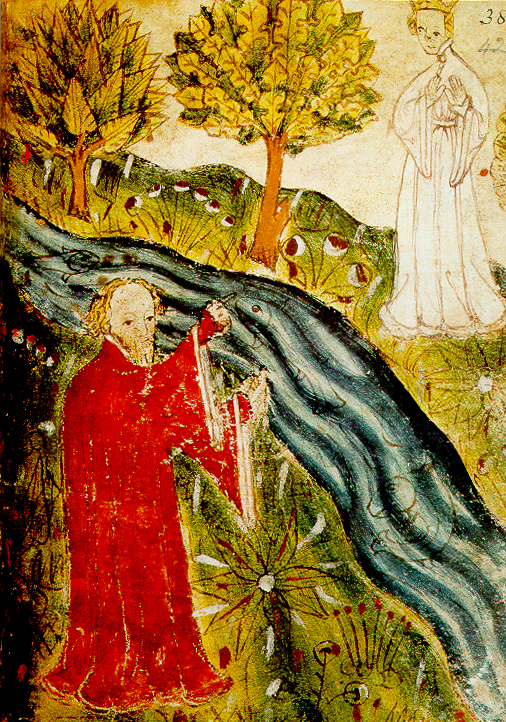
The Gawain Poet (fl. c. 1375–1400), manuscript painting (as the father in Pearl)

The "Gawain Poet" (/ˈɡɑːweɪn, ˈɡæ-, -wɪn, ɡəˈweɪn/ GA(H)-wayn, -win, gə-WAYN; fl. late 14th century), or less commonly the "Pearl Poet", is the name given to the author of Sir Gawain and the Green Knight, an alliterative poem written in 14th-century Middle English. Its author appears also to have written the poems Pearl, Patience, and Cleanness; some scholars suggest the author may also have composed Saint Erkenwald. Save for the last (found in BL-MS Harley 2250), all these works are known from a single surviving manuscript, the British Library holding 'Cotton MS' Nero A.x. This body of work includes some of the most highly-regarded poetry written in Middle English.

The Gawain Poet is unidentified. Various scholars have suggested that the poem is attributable to a member of the landed Massey family of Cheshire, and in particular John Massey of Cotton. This is not widely accepted, however, and the labels "Pearl Poet" or "Gawain Poet" are still preferred.

== Conjectured biography ==
The language of the poems shows that the poet was a contemporary of Geoffrey Chaucer, John Gower, and William Langland, who are sometimes (following the suggestion of academic John Burrow) collectively called the Ricardian Poets in reference to the reign of Richard II of England. All four poems of the Cotton MS Nero A X manuscript are in the same Middle English dialect, localised to the area of north-western Staffordshire, north east Shropshire and south-eastern Cheshire, in the English Midlands. This may merely indicate the dialect of the scribe responsible for copying the poems, but there is good evidence that the dialect of poet and scribe were very similar. It is, therefore, thought most likely that the poet was a native of north Shropshire, east Cheshire or west Staffordshire and was writing in the latter part of the 14th century: based particularly on the narrative voice of Pearl, the poet is thought to have been male. Internal evidence indicates that all four works were probably written by the same author, though their similar dialect and presence in the same manuscript have usually been taken as the strongest evidence of common authorship.

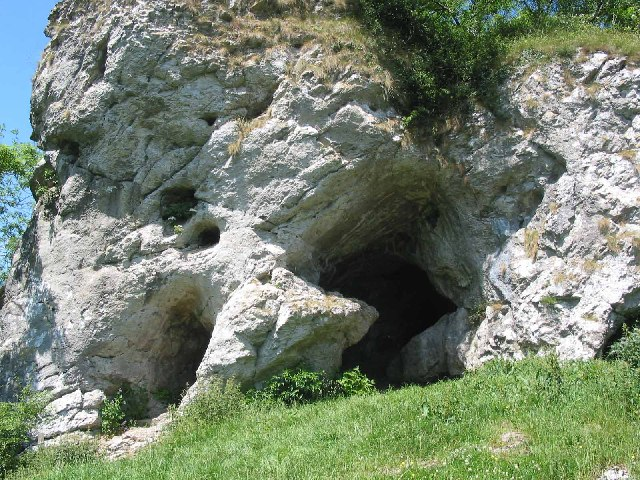
The caves at Wetton Mill, near Leek, Staffordshire, have been identified as a possible inspiration for the "Green Chapel" in Gawain and the Green Knight, given the author's dialect and the geography indicated in the poem.

Any other information must be deduced from the poems' themes, as there is neither a definite authorial attribution within them nor any 'tradition' as to the author's identity (as with Langland and Piers Plowman). The poet seems to have been well-educated; shows a deep knowledge of the technical vocabulary of hunting, as in the description of the horn signals in Sir Gawain and the Green Knight; also shows some knowledge of royal courts; vividly describes the landscape of the region; and has an interest in poverty as a Christian virtue. However, the writer of the Cotton MS Nero A X poems never refers to contemporary scholarship, as, for example, Chaucer does. The poems show a tendency to refer to materials from the past (the Arthurian legends, stories from the Bible) rather than any new learning, so it is perhaps less possible to associate the poet with universities, monasteries or the court in London. Even so, the Gawain Poet must have been educated and was probably of a certain social standing, perhaps a member of a family of landed gentry. J. R. R. Tolkien and E. V. Gordon, after reviewing the allusions, style, and themes of Gawain and the Green Knight, concluded in 1925:

He was a man of serious and devout mind, though not without humour; he had an interest in theology, and some knowledge of it, though an amateur knowledge perhaps, rather than a professional; he had Latin and French and was well enough read in French books, both romantic and instructive; but his home was in the West Midlands of England; so much his language shows, and his metre, and his scenery.

The poet began writing during a time of rapid change and development in English literature. His language was arguably also influenced by 14th-century social developments, particularly the movement toward a more anglicised ruling class and political identity, and by changes in the English language, primarily driven by exposure to dialects of French. The sophistication of the poet's literary style, and his references to pursuits such as heraldry and hunting, suggest a writer aiming at a cultured audience.

In their use of Latin, Purity, Patience, and Pearl show the poet's knowledge of the Vulgate Bible. In Pearl the poet shows knowledge not only of the Book of Revelation, but also of many other parts of the Bible. It is possible that the poet consulted Latin commentaries on Revelation and Genesis. The work makes use of well-established Christian interpretations of elements in the Old Testament, such as treating Jonah's descent into the whale as a form of Christ's descent into Hell, or using Abraham's three angels as a type of the Trinity. What most interested the poet, however, seems to have been the literal sense of Biblical sources as opposed to their typological or allegorical significance.

Pearl also shows the poet's understanding of mystical theology. It is pointed out that the Dreamer's definition of his vision as a 'gostly drem' (Line 790) indicates the poet's familiarity with the classification of visions used by mystical theologians and the mystics themselves. There is no need to suggest any extraordinary learning on the poet's part; most of the devotional writings were widely and easily understood.

It is difficult to find evidence that the poet shared knowledge of classical poets, such as Virgil and Ovid, with the likes of Chaucer. However, there have been claims that certain small debts can be detected in Sir Gawain and the Green Knight to Virgil and to Seneca the Younger, and it is highly likely that the poet was familiar with a wide range of Latin literature that was current among the educated class in the Middle Ages.

The chronology of the "Alliterative Revival" of which these works are a significant part, cannot be established with any precision. It is assumed that the revival began in the south-west midlands and fully flowered in the late fourteenth century. While Cheshire monasteries were not as well endowed as those in the south-west midlands, they would have included the main Latin works used as sources by the alliterative poets. Dating the works written by the Gawain-poet is most problematic because the works could have been written as early as the 1360s or as late as the manuscript itself, which dates around 1400. It is assumed that the poet was alive during the mid-1370s to mid-1380s. The British Library Cotton MS Nero A X is the only surviving Middle English manuscript collection consisting solely of alliterative poems. There is firm consensus that the dialect of the scribe and the author localises the poem to the north-west Midlands, centring on Cheshire. To present the historical background of Sir Gawain and the Green Knight and associated poems is ultimately a quest to find the anonymous poet. The notion that the Gawain-poet was attached to a provincial noble household, perhaps like that of Sir Bertilak, remains attractive to a number of critics. The quest for the Green Chapel brings Sir Gawain into Cheshire from Wales. Sir Robert Grosvenor, Sheriff of Chester was born c. 1342 at Hulme, Cheshire, England and is an appropriate reference-point in the investigation for the world of the poet. Grosvenor's manor house at Hulme is only a few miles north of the area pin-pointed by dialectologists, on the uplands associated with the Green Chapel mentioned in the poem.

== Theories as to possible identity ==
=== John Prat, John Donne ===
A number of scholars have proposed that Pearl was written to commemorate the daughter of John Hastings, Earl of Pembroke, and two of his clerks, John Prat and John Donne, have been advanced as possible candidates for authorship.

=== "Huchoun" ===
A theory current in the early part of the 20th century held that a man called Huchoun ("little Hugh") may have authored the poems, having been credited with several works, including at least one known to be in the alliterative form, in the Chronicle of Andrew of Wyntoun. As Cotton MS Nero A X contains the words "Hugo de" added in a later hand, its contents were identified with some of the works mentioned by Wyntoun.

This argument, made in greatest detail by a Scottish antiquarian, George Neilson (who claimed that Hugh was a Scottish knight, Hugh of Eglington), is nowadays disregarded, mainly because the poems attributed to Hugh seem to have been composed in widely varying dialects.

=== John (or Hugh) Massey ===
The surname of Massey, that of a prominent Cheshire family, is associated with St Erkenwald, a poem occasionally claimed to be another of the Pearl poet's works; the names of Thomas Massey and Elizabeth Booth (a member of the Booth family of Dunham Massey) are written in St Erkenwald's manuscript.

In 1956, Ormerod Greenwood, working on a translation of Gawain, made the suggestion that the author of Pearl and Gawain was one of the Masseys of Sale. He suggested Hugh Massey, based on a number of puns he found incorporated in Pearl (in addition to the "Hugo de" inscription in Cotton MS Nero A X) Given the obvious link through the name "Hugh", Hugh Massey has been conflated with Huchoun by some academics.

A later suggestion is John Massey of Cotton, Cheshire; this was first put forward by Nolan and Farley-Hills in 1971. John Massey's authorship is further supported, according to Nolan, by one of Thomas Hoccleve's poems, in which Hoccleve mentions "my maister Massy", indicating him to be a fearsome critic of poetic metre. The attribution to John Massey is not, however, widely supported by modern critics of the poem.

=== John Stanley ===
Andrew Breeze has suggested Sir John Stanley (c. 1350–1414) as a possible identity for the poet. He was a Knight of the Garter, and the presence at the end of Sir Gawain of the Garter motto Honi soit qui mal y pense (there rendered hony soyt qui mal pence) is put forward in support. He was also familiar with hunting and armoury, as described in Gawain, and came from the appropriate part of England. This theory follows on from Gervase Mathews proposal of Stanley as the poet's patron.

=== Richard Newton ===
Bennett (1979) suggested that Sir Gawain was written by an ancestor of the north-western landowner Humphrey Newton, who appears to have been familiar with the poem in the 16th century. Richard Newton, some of whose occasional verse in the late fourteenth century has survived, was suggested as a candidate, based on perceived stylistic similarities of his work to parts of Sir Gawain. The theory was not widely accepted.
