= Patience (poem) =

Middle English alliterative poem

- Author(s): Gawain Poet (anonymous)
- Language: Middle English, North West Midlands dialect
- Date: late 14th century
- Provenance: Henry Savile, Yorkshire
- Series: together with Sir Gawain and the Green Knight, Pearl (poem) and Cleanness
- Manuscript(s): Cotton Nero A.x.
- First printed edition: 1864 Richard Morris
- Genre: Poem, didactic, homiletic and alliterative verse
- Verse form: Alliterative Revival
- Length: 530 lines
- Subject: Virtues of patience

Patience (Middle English: Pacience) is a Middle English alliterative poem written in the late 14th century. Its unknown author, designated the "Pearl Poet" or "Gawain Poet", also appears, on the basis of dialect and stylistic evidence, to be the author of Sir Gawain and the Green Knight, Pearl, and Cleanness (all ca. 1360–1395) and may have composed St. Erkenwald. This is thought to be true because the techniques and vocabulary of regional dialect of the unknown author is that of Northwest Midlands, located between Shropshire and Lancashire.

The manuscript, Cotton Nero A.x is in the British Library. The first complete publication of Patience was in Early English Alliterative Poems in the West Midland Dialect of the fourteenth century, printed by the Early English Text Society in 1864. Of Patience, considered the slightest of the four poems, its only manifest source is the Vulgate Bible. It also resembles Latin poems by Tertullian and Bishop Marbod. There are certain mannerisms found in Patience that Pearl does not have. For instance, both homilies clearly follow the same pattern: 1. statement of theme, 2. announcement of the text from the New Testament, 3. discussion of another passage from the New Testament in elucidation of that text, 4. and elaborate paraphrase of exemplum or exempla, from the Old Testament.

== Genre and poetics ==
A didactic, homiletic poem, “Patience” consists of 530 lines. Alliteration is used consistently throughout the poem, usually with three alliterating words per line. The very last line repeats the opening line of the poem, giving it a kind of cyclic feel. The unidentified narrator speaks in the first person throughout the work, posing as an autobiography.

== Narrative ==
The narrator/homilist begins by praising patience, setting it among eight virtues (which he calls blessings) or typically known as the Beatitudes in Matthew 5:3-10 from the Sermon on the Mount, which he hears in mass one day. He closely associates it with poverty, closing with an admonition not to grumble or fight one's fate, as Jonah did (ll. 1 - 56). The remainder of the work utilizes the story of Jonah as an exemplum which illustrates and justifies the admonition to accept the will of God patiently. Jonah's story delineates his own impatience because he could not handle the burden of what he was supposed to do — preach to the Ninevites. Notably, patience is generally paired in opposition to sloth. Medieval schools of thought would have condemned sloth, portraying negative consequences of those who fall into sloth, which essentially, is what the poet is trying to convey. Jonah, although written centuries prior to the poet's time, is an exemplary model of impatience, yet God still shows his loving mercy toward him, demonstrating that "the love he feels for his creatures whom he has nurtured and thus does not want to harm them" (Szarmach, 531). The poem ends with its opening lines.

== Author ==
Though the real name of the author, called the "Gawain Poet", is unknown, some inferences can be drawn from an informed reading of the works. The original manuscript is known in academic circles as Cotton Nero A.x, following a naming system used by one of its owners, Robert Cotton, a collector of Medieval English texts.

Before the manuscript came into Cotton's possession, it was in the library of Henry Savile of Bank in Yorkshire. Little is known about its previous ownership, and until 1824, when the manuscript was introduced to the academic community in a second edition of Thomas Warton's History edited by Richard Price, it was almost entirely unknown. Now held in the British Library, it has been dated to the late 14th century, so the poet was a contemporary of Geoffrey Chaucer, author of The Canterbury Tales, though it is highly unlikely that they ever met. The three other works found in the same manuscript as Pearl (commonly known as Sir Gawain and the Green Knight, Pearl, and Cleanness or Purity) are often considered to be written by the same author, who is accepted to be from the Staffordshire/North Shropshire/Cheshire area. However, the manuscript containing these poems was transcribed by a copyist and not by the original poet, known by scribal errors. Suggested emendations may be found in "Patience: An Alliterative Version of "Jonah" by the Poet of "Pearl." Although nothing explicitly suggests that all four poems are by the same poet, comparative analysis of dialect, verse form, and diction have pointed towards single-authorship.

What is known today about the poet is largely general. As J. R. R. Tolkien and E. V. Gordon, after reviewing the text's allusions, style, and themes, concluded in 1925:

He was a man of serious and devout mind, though not without humour; he had an interest in theology, and some knowledge of it, though an amateur knowledge perhaps, rather than a professional; he had Latin and French and was well enough read in French books, both romantic and instructive; but his home was in the West Midlands of England; so much his language shows, and his metre, and his scenery.

W. A. Davenport commented:

The Gawain-poet had a flair for vivid pictures and dramatic situations, and found intellectual delight in pattern: combinations of qualities provides much of the enjoyment of the poems, the conflict between them some uncertainty and complexity. Four works were shaped by a man of subtle mind, interested in not just narrative and describing opportunities of his material, but in exploring its equivocal nature. Many problems experienced by readers in interpreting poems, and the wide variety of interpretations offered for Sir Gawain and the Green Knight are shown to stem from the poet’s complex view of moral questions (103).

The most commonly suggested candidate for authorship is John Massey of Cotton, Cheshire. He is known to have lived in the dialect region of the Gawain Poet and is thought to have written the poem, St. Erkenwald, which some scholars argue bears stylistic similarities to Gawain. St. Erkenwald, however, has been dated by some scholars to a time outside the Gawain poet's era. Thus, ascribing authorship to John Massey is still controversial and most critics consider the Gawain poet an unknown.

== Style ==
Although most of the work is a paraphrase of the biblical Book of Jonah, the poet has expanded upon the text in many places. The chief characteristics of his expansions are a colloquial tone, esp. in Jonah's prayers and his conversations with God, and the concrete descriptions which are used throughout. The homilist is creative, which Jonah's monologues and descriptions of the storm and belly of the whale unveil the poet's improvisation and colorful retelling of story, such as the manner how Jonah floats into the whale's mouth "like a mote going through the church door" (268). This is meant as the antithesis of its example. Jonah is the impatient, which makes for a perfect "what not to do" example to include the poet's story. Furthermore, the author changes perspective "with an eye toward the psychological motives of God, as well as Jonah" (Szarmach, 568). This humanizes God, which would not have been a known theological concept in the 14th century, distinguishing this poem from the others.

== Editions and translations ==
=== Editions ===
- Vantuono, William, ed. (1984) The Pearl Poems : an omnibus edition New York: Garland Pub. ISBN 0-8240-5450-4 (v. 1) ISBN 0-8240-5451-2 (v. 2) Text in both Middle English and Modern English
- Andrew, Malcolm and Waldron, Ronald. 2007. The Poems of the Pearl Manuscript. Exeter: U of Exeter P. (5th ed.) ISBN 978-0-85989-791-4.

=== Translations ===
- Finch, Casey. “The Complete Works of the Pearl Poet” 1993. Berkeley: University of California Press. ISBN 0-520-07871-3.
