= Pearl (poem) =

14th-century English poem

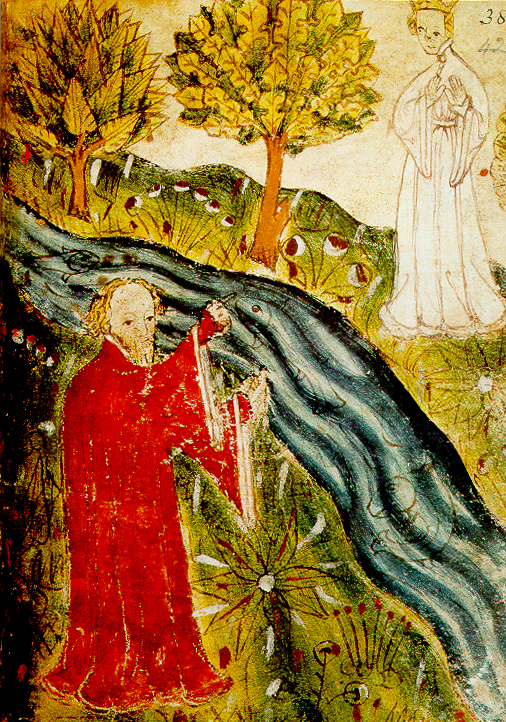
- Miniature from Cotton MS Nero A X. The Dreamer stands on the other side of the stream from the Pearl-maiden.
- Author(s): Gawain Poet (anonymous)
- Language: Middle English, North West Midlands dialect
- Date: late 14th century
- Provenance: Henry Savile, Yorkshire
- Series: together with Sir Gawain and the Green Knight, Cleanness and Patience
- Manuscript(s): Cotton MS Nero A X
- First printed edition: 1864 Richard Morris
- Genre: Poem, elegy, allegory and alliterative verse
- Verse form: Alliterative Revival, rhyme ABABABABBCBC
- Length: 101 stanzas, 1212 lines
- Subject: Father mourning the loss of his daughter ('pearl')
- Text: Pearl at Wikisource

Pearl (Middle English: Perle) is a late 14th-century Middle English poem that is considered one of the most important surviving Middle English works. With elements of medieval allegory and from the dream vision genre, the poem is written in a North-West Midlands variety of Middle English and is highly—though not consistently—alliterative; there is, among other stylistic features, a complex system of stanza-linking.

A father, mourning the loss of his perle (pearl), falls asleep in a garden; in his dream, he encounters the 'Pearl-maiden'—a beautiful and heavenly woman—standing across a stream in a strange landscape. In response to his questioning and attempts to obtain her, she answers with Christian doctrine. Eventually she shows him an image of the Heavenly City, and herself as part of the retinue of Christ the Lamb. However, when the Dreamer attempts to cross the stream, he awakens suddenly from his dream and reflects on its significance.

The poem survives in a single manuscript held at the British Library, known as Pearl Manuscript, which includes two other religious narrative poems, Patience and Cleanness, as well as the romance Sir Gawain and the Green Knight. All are thought to be by the same author, dubbed the "Pearl Poet" or "Gawain Poet", on the evidence of stylistic and thematic similarities. The first complete publication of Pearl, Patience and Cleanness was in Early English Alliterative Poems in the West Midland Dialect of the fourteenth century, printed by the Early English Text Society in 1864.

== Author ==
Though the real name of the "Gawain Poet" (or poets) is unknown, some inferences about them can be drawn from an informed reading of their works. The original manuscript is known in academic circles as Cotton Nero A.x, following a naming system used by one of its owners, Robert Cotton, a collector of medieval English texts. Before the manuscript came into Cotton's possession, it was in the library of Henry Savile of Bank in Yorkshire. Little is known about its previous ownership, and until 1824, when the manuscript was introduced to the academic community in a second edition of Thomas Warton's History edited by Richard Price, it was almost entirely unknown. Now held in the British Library, it has been dated to the late 14th century, so the poet was a contemporary of Geoffrey Chaucer, author of The Canterbury Tales; however, it is highly unlikely that the two ever met. The three other works found in the same manuscript as Pearl (commonly known as Sir Gawain and the Green Knight, Patience, and Cleanness or Purity) are often considered to be written by the same author. However, the manuscript containing these poems was transcribed by a copyist and not by the original poet. Although nothing explicitly suggests that all four poems are by the same poet, comparative analysis of dialect, verse form, and diction have pointed towards common authorship.

What is known today about the poet is general. As J. R. R. Tolkien and E. V. Gordon, after reviewing the text's allusions, style, and themes, concluded in 1925:

He was a man of serious and devout mind, though not without humour; he had an interest in theology, and some knowledge of it, though an amateur knowledge perhaps, rather than a professional; he had Latin and French and was well enough read in French books, both romantic and instructive; but his home was in the West Midlands of England; so much his language shows, and his metre, and his scenery.

The poet is understood to have lived in the North Shropshire/Cheshire/Staffordshire dialect region.

Some scholars believe that the Gawain Poet was also the author of the poem St. Erkenwald, which bears stylistic similarities to Gawain.

The most commonly suggested candidate for authorship is John Massey of Cotton, Cheshire, though he has been dated by some scholars to a time outside the Gawain poet's era. Thus, ascribing authorship to John Massey is still controversial and a number of critics are not confident to go beyond saying the Gawain poet cannot yet be confidently identified beyond the region he came from.

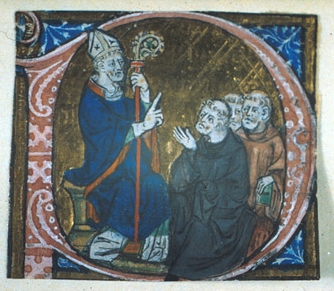
St Erkenwald, Saxon Prince, bishop and saint known as the "Light of London": inspiration for a potentially allied poem by the same poet

== Genre and poetics ==
Since the time of the poem's first publication in the late 19th century, a great deal of critical discussion has taken place on the question of to which genre the poem belongs. Early editors, such as Morris, Gollancz and Osgood, took for granted that the poem was an elegy for the poet's lost daughter (presumed to have been named Margaret, i.e. 'pearl'); several scholars however, including W. H. Schofield, R. M. Garrett, and W. K. Greene were quick to point out the flaws in this assumption and sought to establish a definitive allegorical reading of the poem. There is no doubt that the poem has elements of medieval allegory and dream vision (as well as the slightly more esoteric genre of the verse lapidary), but all attempts to reduce the poem's complex symbolism to a single interpretation have fallen flat. More recent criticism has pointed to the subtle, shifting symbolism of the pearl as one of the poem's chief virtues, recognizing that there is no inherent contradiction between the poem's elegiac and its allegorical aspects, and that the sophisticated allegorical significance of the Pearl Maiden is not unusual but in fact has several quite well-known parallels in medieval literature, the most celebrated being probably Dante's Beatrice.

Besides the symbolic, on a sheer formal level, Pearl is almost astounding in its complexity, and is recognized to be, in the words of one prominent scholar, "the most highly wrought and intricately constructed poem in Middle English" (Bishop 27). It is 1212 lines long, and has 101 stanzas of 12 lines, each with the rhyme scheme ABABABABBCBC. Stanzas are grouped in sections of five (except for XV, which has six), and each section is marked by a capital letter in the manuscript; within each section, the stanzas are tied together by the repetition of a key "link"-word in the last line of each section, which is then echoed in the first line of the following section. The oft-praised "roundness" of the poem is thus emphasized, and the final link-word is repeated in the first line of the whole, forging a connection between the two ends of the poem and producing a structure that is itself circular. Alliteration is used frequently, but not consistently, throughout the poem, and there are several other sophisticated poetic devices.

== Structure and content ==
The poem may be divided into three parts: an introduction (or "Prologue"), a dialogue between the two main characters in which the Pearl instructs the narrator, and a description of the New Jerusalem with the narrator's awakening.

=== Prologue ===
Sections I–IV (stanzas 1–20) The narrator, distraught at the loss of his Pearl, falls asleep in an "erber grene"—a green garden—and begins to dream. In his dream he is transported to an other-worldly garden; the divine is thus set in opposition to the terrestrial, a persistent thematic concern within the poem. Wandering by the side of a beautiful stream, he becomes convinced paradise is on the other shore. As he looks for a crossing, he sees a young maid whom he identifies as his Pearl. She welcomes him.

=== Dialogue ===
==== Sections V–VII (stanzas 21–35) ====
When he asks whether she is the pearl he has lost, she tells him he has lost nothing, that his pearl is merely a rose which has naturally withered. He wants to cross to her side, but she says it is not so easy, that he must resign himself to the will and mercy of God. He asks about her state. She tells him that the Lamb has taken her as His queen.

==== Sections VIII–XI (stanzas 36–60) ====
He wonders whether she has replaced Mary as Queen of Heaven. He also objects that she was too young to merit such an exalted position through her works. She responds that no one envies Mary's position as Queen of courtesy, but that all are members of the body of Christ. Adopting a homiletic discourse, she recounts as proof the Parable of the Workers in the Vineyard. He objects to the idea that God rewards every man equally, regardless of his apparent due. She responds that God gives the same gift of Christ's redemption to all.

==== Sections XII–XV (stanzas 61–81) ====
She instructs him on several aspects of sin, repentance, grace and salvation. She describes the earthly and the heavenly Jerusalem, citing the Apostle John and focusing on Christ's past sacrifice and present glory. She wears the Pearl of Great Price because she has been washed in the blood of the Lamb and advises him to forsake all and buy this pearl.

=== Epilogue ===
==== Sections XVI–XX (stanzas 82–101) ====
He asks about the heavenly Jerusalem; she tells him it is the city of God. He asks to go there; she says that God forbids that, but he may see it by a special dispensation. They walk upstream, and he sees the city across the stream, which is described in a paraphrase of the Apocalypse. He also sees a procession of the blessed. Plunging into the river in his desperation to cross, he awakes from the dream back in the "erber" and resolves to fulfill the will of God.

== Afterlife ==
Death and transience are major themes in the poem; outside of the Parable of the Workers in the Vineyard which we are presented in stanzas 42–60 we see notable reference to another biblical passage Matthew's Sermon on the Mount, in which he states "Do not lay up for yourselves treasure on earth where they moth and rust destroy ... but lay up for yourselves treasure in heaven where neither moth nor rust destroys" (Matthew 6:19–21). This lesson becomes vital to the speakers understanding of death: we see him at the opening of the text tormented by images of death and decay in relation to his daughter who we are told "lyfed not two yer". The text repeatedly highlights the faults in her father's materialistic views, as the maiden never refers to him by name but simply as "jeweller", and a distinctly poor one at that, appearing unable to realise the girl's true heavenly wealth; while her purity and innocence are displayed through several features—her white clothing, radiance, and pale complexion (all of which could also be considered as traits of a pearl). The apparition then rejoicingly informs the man that she now stands at the side of Christ as one of the 144 thousand brides of the lamb, residing in New Jerusalem as a Queen.

The text's structure of 1212 lines is reflective of this heavenly city, which is said in the Book of Revelation to be twelve thousand by twelve thousand furlongs and containing twelve gates for the twelve tribes of Israel (Revelation 21:12–17). But its poetic symmetry seems to be offset with the addition of an extra stanza bringing its total to 101, several scholars have suggested it to be reflective of the Pearl's encasement while others such as literary critic Sarah Stanbury believe it "suggests new beginnings after return". Towards the close of the poem, we are given a hallucinatory description of the spiritual bliss which awaits the virtuous within this golden citadel situated on a hill of precious stones. We will begin to see a slow and gradual break down in our protagonist's urbanity as he struggles to grasp the conventions of this realm, the dreamer's perceived ownership of the maiden "my Pearl", is an attitude derived from the social norms of the period as "the woman has no life outside the home, but simply moves, plotlessly, from daughterhood to wifehood". A process which death has interrupted for the Pearl and the Jeweller, but still, he assumes a patriarchal role and wrongly surmises that he may remain in this paradise devoid of her permission. However, the reversal in social status enables the divinely proclaimed Queen to ethically educate the dreamer during her assault on his morality, yet it seems to little avail. In the final stanzas of the poem, we witness the jeweller defiantly attempt to leap the brook which separates the living from this Edenic paradise, only for him to awaken once more upon the burial mound.

== Editions ==
- Richard Morris, ed. "Early English Alliterative Poems", EETS o.S. 1 (1864; revision 1869; reprint 1965).
- Sir Israel Gollancz, ed. and trans. "Pearl", (London 1891; revision 1897; 2nd edition with Giovanni Boccaccio's Olympia, 1921)
- Charles C. Osgood, ed. "The Pearl" (Boston and London, 1906)
- Sophie Jewett, trans. The Pearl. A Middle English Poem: A Modern Version in the Metre of the Original (New York: Thomas Y. Crowell & Co., 1908)
- "Pearl, Cleanness, Patience and Sir Gawain, reproduced in facsimile from the unique MS. Cotton Nero A.x. in the British Museum", introduction by Sir Israel Gollancz, EETS OS 162 (London, 1923)
- E. V. Gordon, ed. "Pearl" (Oxford, 1953).
- Sister Mary V. Hillmann, ed. and trans., "The Pearl" (New York, 1961; 2nd edition., introduction by Edward Vasta, 1967)
- Charles Moorman, ed. "The Works of the 'Gawain'-Poet", (Jackson, Mississippi, 1977)
- A. C. Cawley and J. J. Anderson, ed., "Pearl, Cleanness, Patience, Sir Gawain and the Green Knight" (London, 1978)
- William Vantuono, ed. The Pearl poems: an omnibus edition (New York: Garland Pub., 1984) ISBN 0-8240-5450-4 (v. 1) ISBN 0-8240-5451-2 (v. 2) Text in both Middle English and Modern English
- Stanbury, Sarah, ed. (2001). Pearl. Kalamazoo, Michigan: Medieval Institute Publications.
- Malcolm Andrew, Ronald Waldron and Clifford Peterson, ed. The Poems of the Pearl Manuscript (Berkeley: University of California Press. Fourth ed. 2002) ISBN 0-85989-514-9.
- Malcolm Andrew, Ronald Waldron, ed. The Poems of the Pearl Manuscript: Pearl, Cleanness, Patience, Sir Gawain and the Green Knight (Exeter: University of Exeter Press, rev. 5th edn., 2007) with a prose translation on CD-ROM. ISBN 978-0-85989-791-4.

== Translations ==
=== Modern English ===
- Brian Stone, "Medieval English Verse" (Harmondsworth, 1964) [contains "Patience" and "Pearl"]
- John Gardner, "The Complete Works of the Gawain Poet" (Chicago, London and Amsterdam, 1965)
- Margaret Williams, "The Pearl-Poet: His Complete Works" (New York, 1967)
- J. R. R. Tolkien, Trans. Sir Gawain and the Green Knight, Pearl, and Sir Orfeo. (New York: Ballantine Books, 1975; repr. 1988) ISBN 0-345-27760-0.
- Marie Borroff, Trans. "Sir Gawain and the Green Knight; Patience; Pearl: verse translations". (New York: W. W. Norton & Company, 1967; repr. 1977, 2001) ISBN 0-393-97658-0
- Casey Finch, "The Complete Works of the Gawain Poet" (Berkeley, Los Angeles and Oxford, 1993) [contains a parallel text with an earlier edition of the Andrew, Waldron and Peterson edition, above]
- Simon Armitage, Pearl (London, Faber and Faber, 2016) ISBN 978-0-5713-0295-6.
- William G Stanton, "A Translation in Verse Of The Middle English Poem Pearl" (Sheffield, Writers Tutorial Publications,2024) ISBN 978-1-3999-8016-6.

=== Other languages ===
- Perla – Pearl (in Croatian). Translated by Luko Paljetak. Zagreb: Matica hrvatska. 2022. ISBN 978-953-341-228-3.

== Adaptations ==
Pearl is the source of Thomas Eccleshare's 2013 play Perle, a solo performance staged in the Soho Theatre.

The Mediaeval Baebes set a passage from Part III to music, recording "Pearl" on their 1998 album Worldes Blysse.

== See also ==
- Allegory in the Middle Ages
