= Cleanness =

1400s Middle English alliterative poem

- Purity
- Author(s): The Gawain Poet (anonymous)
- Language: Middle English, North West Midlands dialect
- Date: late 14th century
- Provenance: Henry Savile, Yorkshire
- Series: together with Sir Gawain and the Green Knight, Pearl and Patience
- Manuscript(s): Cotton Nero A.x.
- First printed edition: 1864 Richard Morris
- Genre: Poem, didactic, homiletic and alliterative verse
- Verse form: Alliterative Revival
- Length: 1812 lines
- Subject: Virtues of cleanliness and delights of married love

Cleanness (Middle English: Clannesse) is a Middle English alliterative poem written in the late 14th century. Its unknown author, designated the Pearl Poet or Gawain Poet, also appears, on the basis of dialect and stylistic evidence, to be the author of Sir Gawain and the Green Knight, Pearl, and Patience, and may have also composed St. Erkenwald.

The poem is found solely in the Pearl manuscript, Cotton Nero A x. That manuscript also contains Pearl, Patience, and Sir Gawain and the Green Knight. None of the poems has a title or divisions of chapters, but the breaks are marked by large initial letters of blue, and there are twelve illustrations (or illuminations) contained within the manuscript, depicting scenes from the four poems. Each of these poems is entirely unique to this one manuscript. Cleanness (which is an editorial title) is also known by the editorial title Purity.

The manuscript, Cotton Nero A.x is in the British Library. The first complete publication of Cleanness was in Early English Alliterative Poems in the West Midland Dialect of the fourteenth century, printed by the Early English Text Society in 1864.

Cleanness is a description of the virtues of cleanliness of body and the delights of married love. It takes three subjects from the Bible as its illustrations: the Flood, the destruction of Sodom and Gomorrah, and the fall of Belshazzar. Each of these is described powerfully, and the poetry is among the finest in Middle English. In each case, the poet warns his readers about the dangers of defilement and the joys of purity.

== Genre and poetics ==
A didactic, homiletic poem, Cleanness consists of 1812 lines. Alliteration is used consistently throughout the poem, averaging around three alliterating words per line. The unidentified narrator or preacher speaks in the first person throughout the work. It is an exemplum from the perspective of many.

== Narrative ==
The opening lines of the poem (ll. 1–50) function as a peroration in which the narrator states his theme by contrasting cleanness and purity with filth. He also points out that God hates filth and banishes those who are not properly dressed.

A paraphrase of the Parable of the Great Banquet follows in lines 51–171. This exemplum, explained by lines 171–192, follows directly from the previous sartorial metaphor and serves to show why the hearers should give attention to cleanness. Following this, lines 193–556 expound on God's forgiveness and wrath, using the Fall of the Angels, the Fall of Adam and Eve (Gen 3), and the story of Noah (Gen 6: 5–32, 7, 8) (the first major exemplum of the poem) to demonstrate these divine attributes.

A transition (ll. 557–599), including a comment on how God reacts to sin (esp. lechery), follows.

In a second exemplum, the poet retells the stories of Abraham and Lot (Gen. 18:1–19, 28) (ll. 600 - 1048), including a description of the Dead Sea as the poet understood it.

In another transition (ll. 1050–1148), the narrator explains the symbolism of the second exemplum, ending with a description of God as strongly vengeful.

The third, and by far the longest, exemplum (ll. 1149–1796) recounts the conquest of Jerusalem by Nebuchadnezzar and the transfer of the Temple treasures to Babylon where they were treated with reverence by the king. But after Nebuchadnezzar died, Belshazzar, a man given to the indulgence of his lusts, succeeded him. During an enormous drunken feast, he ordered that the Temple vessels be brought in and that everyone be served in them. God then determines to punish him. A huge hand appears, writes a message on the wall, and vanishes. No one can interpret this message. At the Queen's suggestion, Daniel is called, and he interprets the three words and predicts Belshazzar's downfall.

In his conclusion (ll. 1797–1812), the narrator summarizes by arguing that uncleanness angers God, and cleanness comforts Him.

== Author ==
Though the real name of the "Gawain Poet" (or poets) is unknown, some inferences about him or her can be drawn from an informed reading of his/her works. The original manuscript is known in academic circles as Cotton Nero A.x, following a naming system used by one of its owners, Robert Cotton, a collector of Medieval English texts. Before the manuscript came into Cotton's possession, it was in the library of Henry Savile of Bank in Yorkshire. Little is known about its previous ownership, and until 1824, when the manuscript was introduced to the academic community in a second edition of Thomas Warton's History edited by Richard Price, it was almost entirely unknown. Now held in the British Library, it has been dated to the late 14th century, so the poet was a contemporary of Geoffrey Chaucer, author of The Canterbury Tales, though it is highly unlikely that they ever met. The three other works found in the same manuscript as Pearl (commonly known as Sir Gawain and the Green Knight, Patience, and Pearl) are often considered to be written by the same author. However, the manuscript containing these poems was transcribed by a copyist and not by the original poet. Although nothing explicitly suggests that all four poems are by the same poet, comparative analysis of dialect, verse form, and diction have pointed towards single-authorship.

What is known today about the poet is largely general. As J. R. R. Tolkien and E. V. Gordon, after reviewing the text's allusions, style, and themes, concluded in 1925:

He was a man of serious and devout mind, though not without humour; he had an interest in theology, and some knowledge of it, though an amateur knowledge perhaps, rather than a professional; he had Latin and French and was well enough read in French books, both romantic and instructive; but his home was in the West Midlands of England; so much his language shows, and his metre, and his scenery.

The most commonly suggested candidate for authorship is John Massey of Cotton, Cheshire. He is known to have lived in the dialect region of the Gawain Poet and is thought to have written the poem, St. Erkenwald, which some scholars argue bears stylistic similarities to Gawain. St. Erkenwald, however, has been dated by some scholars to a time outside the Gawain poet's era. Thus, ascribing authorship to John Massey is still controversial, and most critics consider the Gawain poet an unknown.

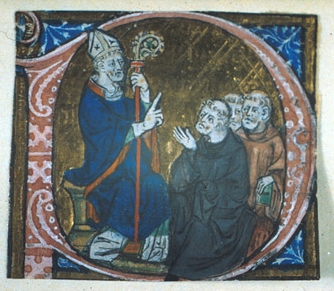
St Erkenwald, the subject of a poem thought by some to be by the same poet

== Technique ==
It uses the homiletic principles of education with entertainment (Horace's utile et dulce) and is primarily rooted in Biblical stories. The reference to the fall of the angels is drawn from pseudepigrapha. The technique of presenting exempla and then explicating them as demonstrations of moral principles is characteristic of many sermons of the medieval period. Here the poet uses three exempla with explication in the transitions between them.

== Editions and translations ==
=== Editions ===
- Andrew, Malcolm and Waldron, Ronald. 2002. The Poems of the Pearl Manuscript. Berkeley: University of California Press. (4th ed.) ISBN 0-85989-514-9.
- Gustafson, Kevin, ed. 2010. Cleanness. Peterborough, ON: Broadview Press. ISBN 978-1-55111-399-9 / 1551113996.
- Vantuono, William, ed. (1984) The Pearl Poems : an omnibus edition. New York: Garland Pub. ISBN 0-8240-5450-4 (v. 1) ISBN 0-8240-5451-2 (v. 2) Text in both Middle English and Modern English

=== Translations ===
- Finch, Casey. "The Complete Works of the Pearl Poet” 1993. Berkeley: University of California Press. ISBN 0-520-07871-3.
