= Chaucer's influence on 15th-century Scottish literature =

Chaucer's influence on 15th-century Scottish literature began towards the beginning of the century with King James I of Scotland. This first phase of Scottish "Chaucerianism" was followed by a second phase, comprising the works of Robert Henryson, William Dunbar, and Gavin Douglas. At this point, England has recognised Scotland as an independent state following the end of the Wars of Scottish Independence in 1357. Because of Scottish history and the English’s recent involvement in that history, all of these writers are familiar with the works of Geoffrey Chaucer.

== Phases of Scottish Chaucerianism ==
=== The first phase of Scottish Chaucerianism ===
James I and his attributed work The Kingis Quair represent the first phase of Chaucerianism, which purposefully and directly imitates the works of Chaucer while preserving the Scottish author’s own uniqueness.

=== The second phase of Scottish Chaucerianism ===
The poems of Robert Henryson, William Dunbar, and Gavin Douglas represent the second phase of Chaucerianism, a more academic one, which adapts Chaucer’s style to the authors’ more individual and nationalistic purposes.

== Not just “Scottish Chaucerians” ==
The 15th century is a time of experimentation and “play” with poetry. The 15th-century poets often attempt to generate new meaning from previous poetry by picking apart the old in order to mold it into something new. Such is the relationship between the so-called Scottish “Chaucerians” and Geoffrey Chaucer himself.

To say Geoffrey Chaucer is the singular influence on these Scottish poets is a definite over-generalization. These poets share in the medieval status of Chaucer, and Chaucer is their immediate predecessor, but the poems retain the distinctiveness of the Scottish authors and traditions. As time continues on in the 15th century, the authors move further and further away from direct similarity with Chaucer. For the 15th-century Scottish poets Chaucer lends an important model, but they use that model for their own purposes.

=== James I of Scotland (1394–1437) ===
King James I of Scotland wrote The Kingis Quair, a series of courtly love poems written in rhyme royal stanzas. This poem is not merely a conventional application of Chaucer’s courtly writing. It also introduces to Scottish literature the discourse of subjectivity, in which the first person is the subject of the poem. The King writes this poem as a sort of autobiography about his experiences in English captivity. Although James I is willing to build on the styles of the English Chaucer, his writing reflects the beginnings of a Scottish national identity. In his poems he narrated the story of his love sincerely no doubt, but not with the dramatic realism of Chaucer. He mixes much allegory with reality.

=== Robert Henryson (c. 1425 – c. 1500) ===
Although there are many similarities between the subject matter and refinement of verse in Chaucer and Henryson, the latter poet transcends literary imitation and brings his own Scottish nationalism into his writing. Henryson’s work concentrates on more local issues in Scotland, which gives his work a more “popular” quality than Chaucer’s. He is also famous being one of the first to write in the idiom that later comes to be known as Scots.

One of Henryson’s greatest achievements is his work The Testament of Cresseid, a critical re-writing of Chaucer’s Troilus and Criseyde. Henryson disregards Chaucer’s conclusion and creates a totally new ending where Troilus is kept alive to permit one final encounter with his lover, who has been reduced to leprosy.

=== William Dunbar (c. 1460 – c. 1520) ===
As Dunbar belongs to the latest medieval phase, his work is quite far from that of Chaucer’s. Although Dunbar's The Tretis includes many ironic gestures that recall the Wife of Bath and The Merchant's Tale, he utilizes a much wilder humor than Chaucer. Dunbar is even credited with the first printed use of the word “fuck.” He does not utilize the Chaucerian palinode, or retraction.

=== Gavin Douglas (c. 1475 – 1522) ===
Douglas’s The Palace of Honour is loosely modeled on Chaucer’s The House of Fame. Like Chaucer’s work, this poem recounts the progress of the dreaming poet’s education, which culminates in a journey to a celestial place. Douglas carries on Chaucerian allegory, but concentrates heavily on cultural nationalism.

His most famous work is his translation of Vergil’s Aeneid, his Eneados, the first complete translation of the Aeneid into an Anglian language. Douglas's native Scottis creates distance from Chaucer’s partial translation of the same text. He also detaches himself from Chaucer by assuming the cultural authority of Vergil as his miglior fabbro, or greater craftsman, not Chaucer.
