= Cotton, Cheshire =

Former civil parish in Cheshire, England

Coordinates: 53.2022°N 2.3786°W

Cotton
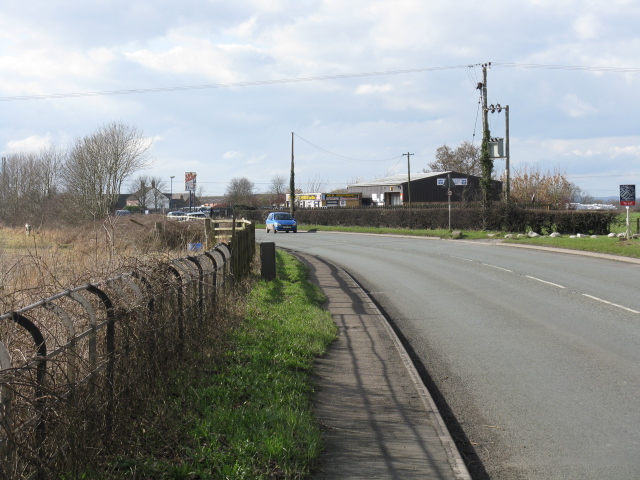
- A54 leaving Holmes Chapel

- Location within Cheshire
- Civil parish: Holmes Chapel
- Unitary authority: Cheshire East
- Ceremonial county: Cheshire
- Region: North West
- Country: England
- Sovereign state: United Kingdom

Cotton is a former civil parish, now in the parish of Holmes Chapel, in the Cheshire East district, in Cheshire, England, on the banks of the River Dane. In 1931 the parish had a population of 33.

== History ==
Cotton was formerly a township in the parish of Sandbach, in 1866 Cotton became a separate civil parish, on 1 April 1936 the parish was abolished and merged with Cranage. In 1982 the area became part of Holmes Chapel. From 1974 to 2009 it was in Congleton district.

== See also ==
- Cotton Edmunds
