= Richard Morris (philologist) =

British philologist (1833–1894)

Richard Morris (8 September 1833 – 12 May 1894), was an English philologist and priest of the Church of England.

== Early life and career ==
Morris was born at Bermondsey on 8 September 1833, of Welsh parentage. He was trained as an elementary schoolmaster at St John's College, Battersea, but his education was for the most part self-acquired. In 1869, he was appointed Winchester lecturer on English language and literature in King's College School.

In 1871, he was ordained, and served for two years as curate of Christ Church, Camberwell. From 1875 to 1888 he served as headmaster of the Royal Masonic School for Boys at Wood Green, and afterwards for a short time master of the grammar school of Dedham, Essex. His diploma of LL.D. was a Lambeth degree, conferred in 1870 by Archbishop Tait.

== Scholarship and publications ==
As early as 1857, Morris showed the bent of his mind by publishing a little book on The Etymology of Local Names. He was one of the first to join as an active member the Chaucer, Early English, and Philological societies, founded by his lifelong friend, Dr F. J. Furnivall. None of his colleagues surpassed him in the devotion which he expended upon editing the oldest remains of our national literature from the original manuscript sources, on the same scientific principles as adopted by classical scholars. Between 1862 and 1880, he brought out no fewer than twelve volumes for the Early English Text Society, including three series of Homilies (1868 onwards) and two of Alliterative Poems (1864). In 1866, he edited Chaucer for the Aldine Poets (2nd ed. 1891). This was the first edition to be based upon manuscripts since that of Thomas Tyrwhitt, and remained the standard one until it was superseded by W. W. Skeat's edition of 1894–7. In 1869, he edited Edmund Spenser for Macmillan's Globe edition, again using manuscripts as well as the original editions. In 1867, he published Specimens of Early English for the Clarendon Press, Oxford, which was augmented by Skeat in later editions.

Morris's long experience as a schoolmaster also prompted him to undertake a series of successful educational works. The first was Historical Outlines of English Accidence (1872), which went through some twenty editions, before being thoroughly revised after the author's death by Henry Bradley and Leon Kellner. In 1874 he brought out Elementary Lessons in Historical English Grammar; and in the same year a primer of English Grammar.

Scarcely had he struck out on this remunerative line of authorship than he turned aside to devote the remainder of his life to the study of Pāli, the sacred language of Buddhism. The stimulus came from his friendship with Professor Thomas Rhys Davids, founder of the Pāli Text Society. For the PTS he edited four texts between 1882 and 1888, more than any other contributor up to that point. But he did not confine himself to editing: his familiarity with the development of early English caused him to take a special interest in the corresponding position of Pāli, as standing midway between the ancient Sanskrit and the modern vernaculars, and as branching out into various dialects known as Prakrits. These relations of Pāli he expounded in a series of letters to the Academy, which were valuable not only for their lexicographical facts, but also as illustrating the historical growth of the languages of India. The last work he was able to complete was a paper on this subject, read before the International Congress of Orientalists in London in September 1892. He was not personably able to correct the proofs of this paper for publication in the Transactions.

== Death ==
For the last two years of his life Morris was prostrated by an incurable and distressing illness, which he bore with fortitude, preserving his cheerfulness and his love of a good story to the last. He retired to the railway-side hamlet of Harold Wood, Essex, where he died on 12 May 1894. He was buried at Hornchurch.

== Recognition and legacy ==
- The University of Oxford awarded Morris the honorary degree of M.A. on 28 May 1874.
- In 1893, William Gladstone granted him an annual pension of £150 on the civil list; and following his death, on 2 June 1896, new pensions of £25 each were created in favour of his three daughters.
- The greater part of his valuable philological library was acquired by the bookseller, David Nutt.

== Sources ==
=== Attribution ===
This article incorporates text from a publication now in the public domain: Cotton, James Sutherland (1901). "Morris, Richard (1833-1894)". In Lee, Sidney (ed.). Dictionary of National Biography (1st supplement). London: Smith, Elder & Co.
