= Richard Price (barrister) =

British barrister

Richard Price (1790–1833) was a British barrister, known as philologist, antiquarian, and literary editor.

== Life ==
He was the eldest son of Richard Price, a merchant. Entering the Middle Temple on 29 May 1823, was called to the bar in 1830, and practised on the western circuit.

Price was a sub-commissioner of the Public Record Commission, and helped Benjamin Thorpe with his Ancient Laws and Institutes of England (1840). As a scholar of northern European literature, he had a reputation with Jacob Grimm, Grímur Jónsson Thorkelin and Edgar Taylor. He died of dropsy on 23 May 1833, at Branch Hill, Hampstead.

== Works ==
In 1824 Price published an edition of Thomas Warton's The History of English Poetry. The long preface was reprinted in the editions of Richard Taylor (1840) and William Carew Hazlitt (1871). Price incorporated notes of George Ashby, Francis Douce, Thomas Park and Joseph Ritson, also adding some of his own. The edition was flawed with mistakes, as Warton's had been.

In 1830 Price revised and brought up to date, in four volumes, Edward Christian's edition of Blackstone's Commentaries of 1809. He also assisted Henry Petrie in his edition of the Saxon Chronicle to 1066, in vol. i. of Monumenta Historica Britannica.

== Notes ==
Attribution

This article incorporates text from a publication now in the public domain: Lee, Sidney, ed. (1896). "Price, Richard (1790-1833)". Dictionary of National Biography. Vol. 46. London: Smith, Elder & Co.
