= King Arthur and King Cornwall =

Traditional song

King Arthur and King Cornwall is an English ballad surviving in fragmentary form in the 17th-century Percy Folio manuscript. An Arthurian story, it was collected by Francis James Child as Child Ballad 30. Unlike other Child Ballads, but like the Arthurian "The Boy and the Mantle" and "The Marriage of Sir Gawain", it is not a folk ballad but a professional minstrel's song. It is notable for containing the Green Knight, a character known from the medieval poems The Greene Knight and the more famous Sir Gawain and the Green Knight; he appears as "Bredbeddle", the character's name in The Greene Knight.

== Synopsis ==
"King Arthur and King Cornwall" occurs in a damaged section of the Percy Folio; about half of each page was ripped out to start fires. As such, the ballad is missing about half of its content, though some of the missing material can be deduced from context. Apparently after bragging about the excellence of his famed Round Table, King Arthur is told by Guinevere that another king has an even better one. Arthur and his company leave their kingdom (here Brittany rather than Great Britain) in disguise searching for this king, and eventually come to Cornwall, where the resident monarch offends them with a series of boasts about his magical items, the child he fathered on Guinevere, and Arthur's comparative mediocrity. All go off to bed, and the Knights of the Round Table make a series of vows against Cornwall's boasts, such as Gawain's declaration that he will make off with Cornwall's daughter.

Arthur's men discover Cornwall has sent a seven-headed monster, a sprite named Burlow Beanie, to spy on them. Sir Bredbeddle, the Green Knight, wages a long battle against him with a sword from Cologne, a Milanese knife, a Danish axe, and finally a sacred page from the Christian Bible gives him the upper hand. As a test of his control over the creature, he orders him to fetch a horse. Though Burlow Beanie obeys, he rebels when another knight, Marramile, tries to control him, and the Green Knight is called in to help. A missing section likely described Arthur's men taking possession of Cornwall's other magical objects and learning the secret of their use from the sprite. The remaining text describes Arthur beheading King Cornwall with his own sword; the final missing half page likely described his triumph.

== Analysis ==
The story resembles Geoffrey Chaucer's "The Squire's Tale" from the Canterbury Tales, the English romance Sir Launfal and especially the Carolingian romance Pèlerinage de Charlemagne, in which Charlemagne and his paladins visit the Byzantine Emperor, superior to Charlemagne in looks according to Charlemagne's wife. They make a series of boasts about their abilities, and are called out on them by the emperor's spy, but are eventually able to fulfill them with help from God. Making chivalric vows is a central theme in the medieval English tale The Avowing of Arthur, while the importance of keeping one's pledges is important to tales like Sir Gawain and the Green Knight and The Wedding of Sir Gawain and Dame Ragnelle.

"King Arthur and King Cornwall" may be a version of a lost medieval story, but it is also possible that it is a product of the 17th century, taking hints from older chivalric romance. The character of Bredbeddle makes the author's knowledge of The Greene Knight obvious; whether made in the 16th century or before, the ballad relies on the audience's knowledge of the Gawain romances popular since the 12th century. Gawain's promise to have his way with Cornwall's daughter is in accordance with his womanizing portrayal in certain Old French works.

The magician-king of Cornwall does not appear in other Arthurian romance. In other stories, Cornwall is ruled by either Arthur's cousin Cador, or by King Mark, the uncle of Tristan and husband of Iseult. Equally unique is Cornwall's daughter, whom he had fathered on Guinevere behind Arthur's back. Several Arthurian staple characters do make appearances, such as Guinevere, Gawain, and Tristan.

== See also ==
- List of the Child Ballads
- List of legendary rulers of Cornwall
