= Bob and wheel =

Pairing of two metrical schemes

Bob and wheel is a pairing of two metrical schemes. The wheel is a type of rhythm used in hymns or narrative songs sung in European churches or gatherings from the 12th to the 16th centuries. A wheel occurs when at the end of each stanza, the song and the lyric return to some peculiar rhythm. In some instances the wheel is a return to something that resembles no definable poetic rhythm. A bob is a very short line, often two assertive syllables that announces the start of the wheel.

As an interruption of the usual rhythm, the bob and wheel has been compared to a cadenza in music. It is a way of adding recurring, abrupt and forceful variety to a song or verse for a short passage.

It is notably used by the poet known as the Gawain Poet (or Pearl Poet) in the ballad Sir Gawain and the Green Knight. The feature is found mainly in Middle English and Middle Scots. There are at least forty known examples of the bob and wheel. The origin of the form is not known; it predates Sir Gawain and the Green Knight.

The term "bob and wheel" was first used by Edwin Guest in The History of English Rhythms.

The Pearl Poet uses the bob and wheel as a transition or pivot between his alliterative verse and a summary/counterpoint rhyming verse, as in this example from the first stanza of Sir Gawain and the Green Knight. The first 14 lines use a pentameter rhythm:

Sithen the sege and the assut was sesed at Troye,
The borgh brittened and brent to brondes and askes,
The tulk that the trammes of tresoun ther wroght
Was tried for his tricherie, the trewest on erthe--
Hit was Ennias the athel and highe kynde,
That sithen depreced provinces and patrounes bicome
Welneghe of al the wele in the west iles.
Fro riche Romulus to Rome ricchis hym swythe,
With gret bobbaunce that burghe he biges upon fyrst,
And nevenes hit his aune nome, as hit now hat.
Ticius to Tuskan and teldes bigynnes,
Langaberde in Lumbardie lyftes up homes,
And fer over the French flod Felix Brutus
On mony bonkkes ful brode Bretayn he settes
with wynne,
Where werre and wrake and wonder
Bi sythes has wont therinne,
And oft bothe blysse and blunder
Ful skete has skyfted synne.

The "with wynne" is the "bob", and it is immediately followed by the four-line "wheel" with its own rhymes and rhythm.

The content of the bob and wheel varies, but, generally, it functions as a refrain, or a summary, or an ironic counterpoint to the stanza that preceded it.

Some Modern English poets and contemporary poets have revived the use of the bob and wheel. It is often considered as a regular metrical form as the Pearl Poet uses it, but in fact, in Middle English, there is great variation, and wheels are often used without the bob.
