= Sir Gawain and the Green Knight =

14th-century Middle English chivalric romance

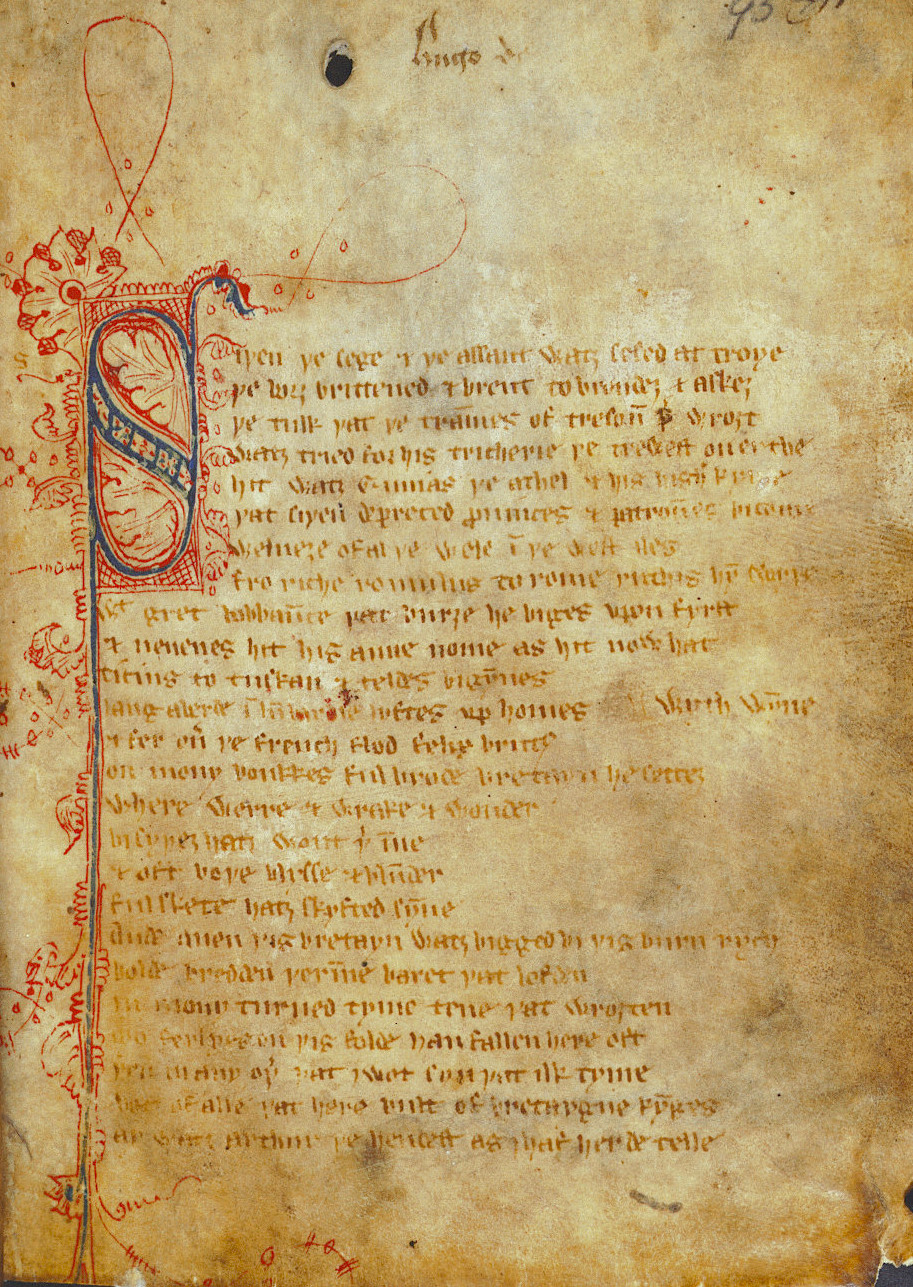
- First page of the only surviving manuscript, c. 14th century
- Author(s): Gawain Poet (anonymous)
- Language: Middle English, North West Midlands dialect
- Date: late 14th century
- Provenance: Henry Savile, Yorkshire
- Series: Together with Pearl, Cleanness, and Patience
- Manuscript(s): Cotton Nero A.x.
- First printed edition: 1839 by Sir Frederic Madden
- Genre: Narrative poem, chivalric romance, Arthurian and alliterative verse
- Verse form: Alliterative Revival with bob and wheel
- Length: 101 stanzas, 2530 lines
- Subject: King Arthur's Court, testing morality
- Setting: North Wales, West Midlands, Peak District
- Personages: Sir Gawain, The Green Knight/Bertilak de Hautdesert, Lady Bertilak, Morgan le Fay, King Arthur, Knights of the Round Table
- Text: Sir Gawain and the Green Knight at Wikisource

Sir Gawain and the Green Knight is a Middle English late 14th-century chivalric romance in alliterative verse. The author is unknown; the title was given centuries later. It is one of the best-known Arthurian stories, with its plot combining two types of folk motifs: the beheading game and the exchange of winnings. Written in stanzas of alliterative verse, each of which ends in a rhyming bob and wheel, it draws on Welsh, Irish, and English stories, as well as the French chivalric tradition. It is an important example of a chivalric romance, which typically involves a hero who goes on a quest that tests his prowess. It remains popular in modern English renderings from J. R. R. Tolkien, Simon Armitage, and others, as well as through film and stage adaptations.

The story describes how Sir Gawain accepts a challenge from a mysterious "Green Knight" who dares any man to strike him with his axe if he will take a return blow in a year and a day. Gawain accepts and beheads him, after which the Green Knight stands, picks up his head, and reminds Gawain of the appointed time. In his struggles to keep his bargain, Gawain demonstrates chivalry and loyalty until his honour is called into question by a test involving the lord and the lady of the castle at which he is a guest. The poem survives in one manuscript, Cotton Nero A.x., which also includes three religious narrative poems: Pearl, Cleanness, and Patience. All four are written in a North / West Midlands dialect of Middle English, and are thought to be by the same author, dubbed the "Pearl Poet" or "Gawain Poet".

== Synopsis ==
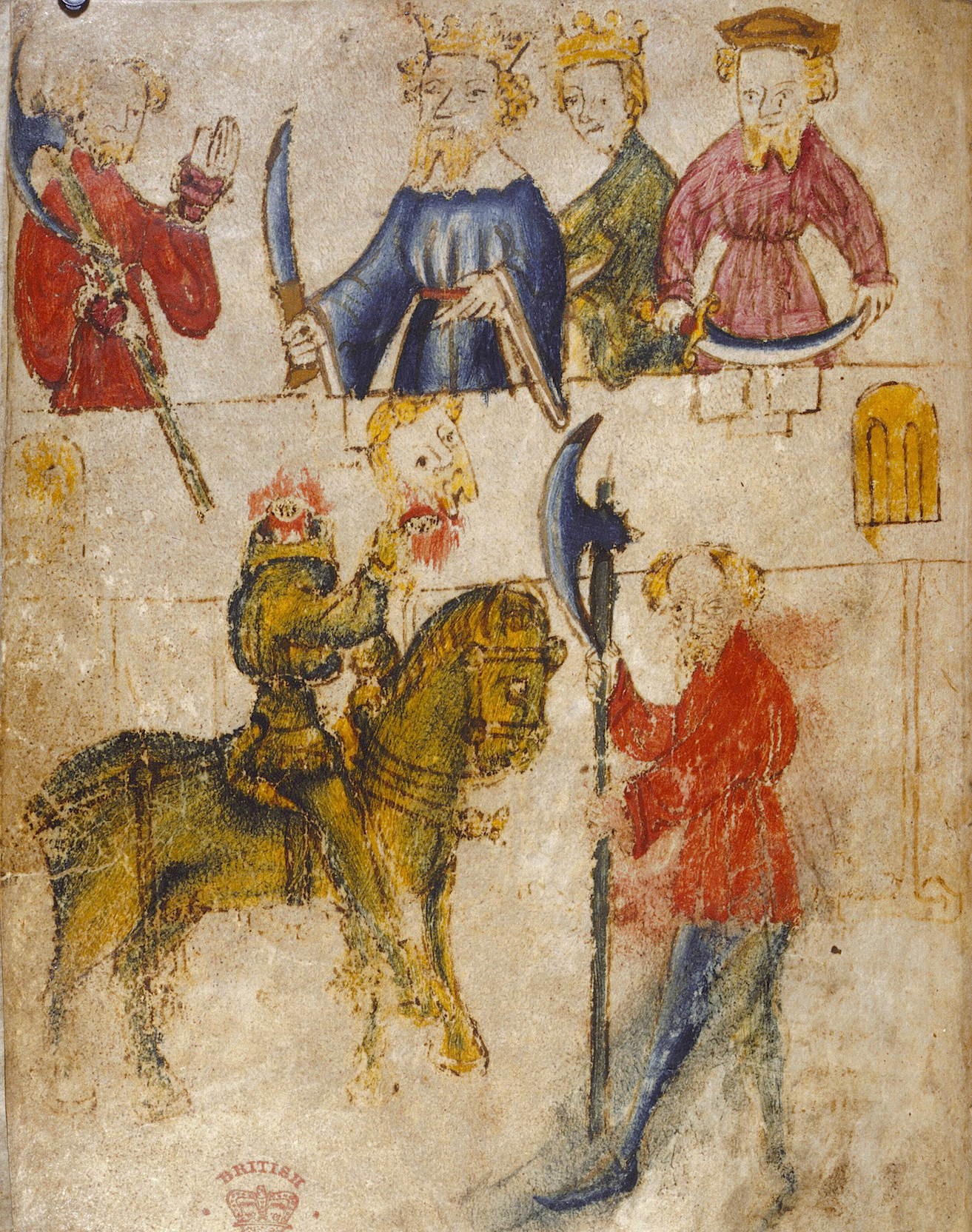
Sir Gawain and the Green Knight (from original manuscript, artist unknown)

In Camelot on New Year's Eve, King Arthur's court is exchanging gifts and waiting for the feasting to start, when the king asks to see or hear of an exciting adventure. A gigantic figure, entirely green in appearance and riding a green horse, rides unexpectedly into the hall. He wears no armour but bears an axe in one hand and a holly bough in the other. Refusing to fight anyone there on the grounds that they are all too weak, he insists he has come for a friendly Christmas game: someone is to strike him once with his axe, on the condition that the Green Knight may return the blow in a year and a day. (Note: First found in English c. 1400, the phrasing of 'a year and a day' "specified in certain legal matters in order to ensure the completion of a full year": comparable terms date from slightly earlier in Middle Dutch, Middle Low German and Anglo-Norman.) The axe will belong to whoever accepts this deal. King Arthur is prepared to accept the challenge when it appears no other knight will dare, but Sir Gawain, youngest of Arthur's knights and his nephew, asks for the honour instead. The giant bends and bares his neck before him and Gawain neatly beheads him in one stroke. However, the Green Knight neither falls nor falters, but instead reaches out, picks up his severed head, and mounts his horse. The Green Knight shows his bleeding head to Queen Guinevere, and reminds Gawain that the two must meet again at the Green Chapel in a year and a day, before the knight rides away. Gawain and Arthur admire the axe, hang it up as a trophy, and encourage Guinevere to treat the whole matter lightly.

As the date approaches, Sir Gawain leaves to find the Green Chapel and keep his part of the bargain. Many adventures and battles are alluded to but not described, until Gawain comes across a splendid castle, where he meets the lord of the castle and his beautiful wife, who are pleased to have such a renowned guest. Also present is an old and ugly lady, unnamed but treated with great honour by all. Gawain tells them of his New Year's appointment at the Green Chapel, and that he has only a few days remaining. The lord laughs, explaining that there is a path that will take him to the chapel less than two miles away, and proposes that Gawain rest at the castle until then. Relieved and grateful, Gawain agrees.

The lord proposes a bargain to Gawain: he goes hunting every day, and he will give Gawain whatever he catches, on the condition that Gawain give him whatever he may gain during the day; Gawain accepts. After he leaves, his wife visits Gawain's bedroom and behaves seductively, but despite her best efforts, he allows her nothing but a single kiss. When the lord returns and gives Gawain the deer he has killed, Gawain gives a kiss to him without divulging its source. The next day the lady returns to Gawain, who again courteously foils her advances, and later that day there is a similar exchange of a hunted boar for two kisses. She comes once more on the third morning, but once her advances are denied, she offers Gawain a gold ring as a keepsake. He gently but steadfastly refuses, but she pleads that he at least take her sash, a girdle of green and gold silk. The sash, the lady assures him, is charmed, and will keep him from all physical harm. Tempted, as he may otherwise die the next day, Gawain accepts it, and they exchange three kisses. The lady has Gawain swear that he will keep the gift secret from her husband. That evening, the lord returns with a fox, which he exchanges with Gawain for the three kisses; Gawain does not mention the sash.

The next day, Gawain binds the sash around his waist. Outside the Green Chapel—only an earthen mound containing a cavern—he finds the Green Knight sharpening an axe. As promised, Gawain bends his bared neck to receive his blow. At the first swing, Gawain flinches slightly and the Green Knight belittles him for it. Ashamed of himself, Gawain does not flinch with the second swing, but again, the Green Knight withholds the full force of his blow. The knight explains he was testing Gawain's nerve. Angrily, Gawain tells him to deliver his blow, and so the knight does, causing only a slight wound on Gawain's neck, and ending the game. Gawain seizes his sword, helmet, and shield, but the Green Knight, laughing, reveals himself to be none other than the lord of the castle, Bertilak de Hautdesert, transformed by magic. He explains that the entire adventure was a trick of the unnamed "elderly lady" Gawain saw at the castle, who is the sorceress Morgan le Fay, Arthur's stepsister, who intended to test Arthur's knights and frighten Guinevere to death. The nick Gawain suffered at the third stroke was because of his attempt to conceal the gift of the sash. Gawain is ashamed to have behaved deceitfully, but the Green Knight laughs and pronounces him the most blameless knight in all the land. The two part on cordial terms. Gawain returns to Camelot wearing the sash as a token of his failure to keep his promise. The Knights of the Round Table absolve him of the blame and decide that henceforth each will wear a green sash in recognition of Gawain's adventure and as a reminder to be honest.

== "Gawain Poet" ==
Though the real name of the "Gawain Poet" (or poets) is unknown, some inferences about them can be drawn from an informed reading of their works. The manuscript of Gawain is known in academic circles as Cotton Nero A.x., following a naming system used by one of its owners, the 16th-century Sir Robert Bruce Cotton, a collector of medieval English texts. Before the Gawain manuscript came into Cotton's possession, it was in the library of Henry Savile in Yorkshire. Little is known about its previous ownership, and until 1824, when the manuscript was introduced to the academic community in a second edition of Thomas Warton's History, edited by Richard Price, it was almost entirely unknown. Even then, the Gawain poem was not published in its entirety until 1839, which is when it was given its present title. Now held in the British Library, it has been dated to the late 14th century, meaning the poet was a contemporary of Geoffrey Chaucer, author of The Canterbury Tales, though it is unlikely that they ever met, and the Gawain poet's English is considerably different from Chaucer's. The three other works found in the same manuscript as Gawain (commonly known as Pearl, Patience, and Cleanness or Purity) are often considered to be written by the same author. However, the manuscript containing these poems was transcribed by a copyist and not by the original poet. Although nothing explicitly suggests that all four poems are by the same poet, comparative analysis of dialect, verse form, and diction have pointed towards single authorship.

What is known today about the poet is general. J. R. R. Tolkien and E.V. Gordon, after reviewing the text's allusions, style, and themes, concluded in 1925:

He was a man of serious and devout mind, though not without humour; he had an interest in theology, and some knowledge of it, though an amateur knowledge perhaps, rather than a professional; he had Latin and French and was well enough read in French books, both romantic and instructive; but his home was in the West Midlands of England; so much his language shows, and his metre, and his scenery.

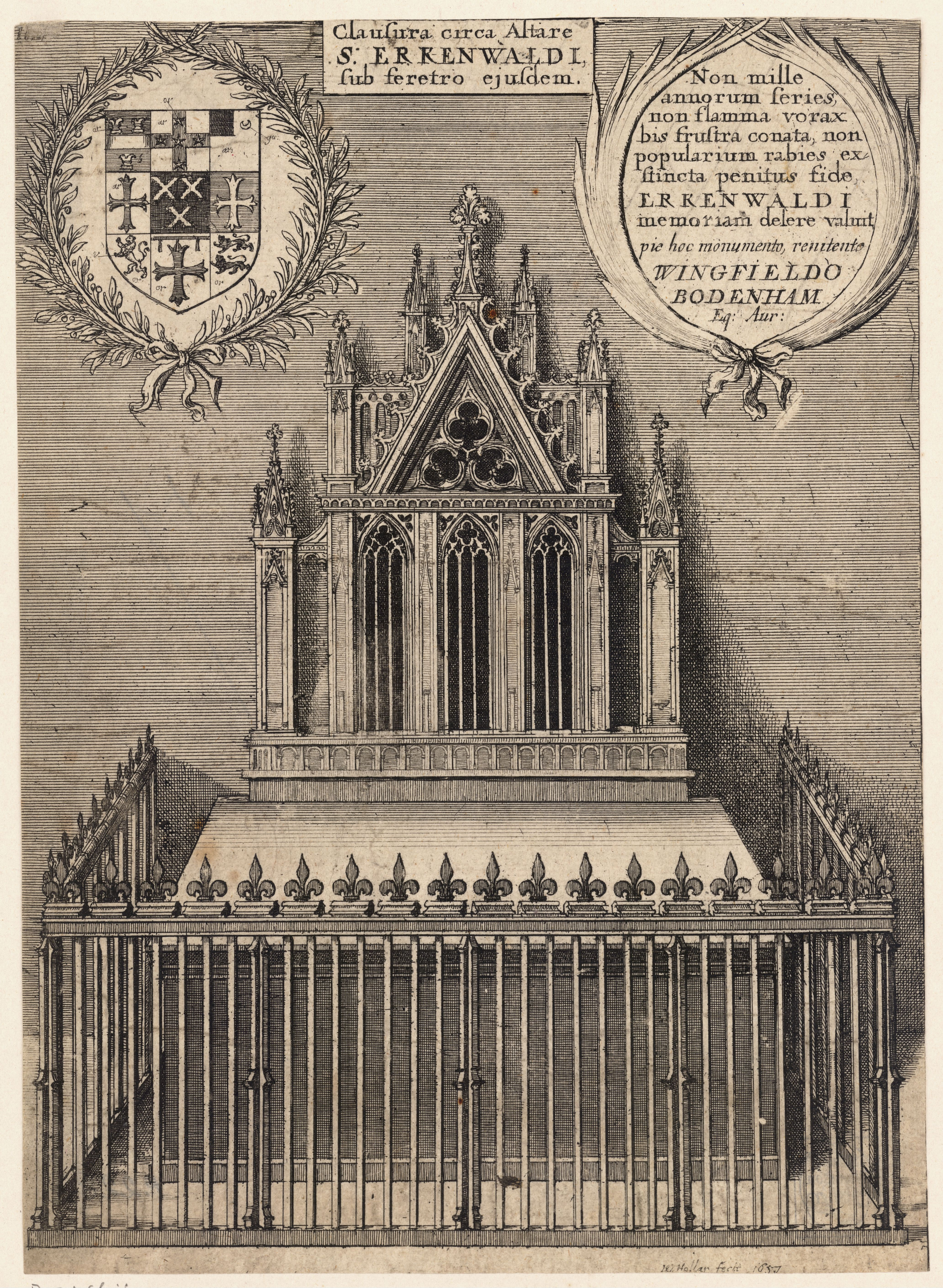
The Shrine of St Erkenwald: the Saxon prince, bishop and saint is thought by some to have inspired the poet who wrote Sir Gawain and the Green Knight to write another eponymous poem.

The most commonly suggested candidate for authorship is John Massey of Cotton, Cheshire. He is known to have lived in the dialect region of the Gawain Poet and is thought to have written the poem St. Erkenwald, which some scholars argue bears stylistic similarities to Gawain. St. Erkenwald, however, has been dated by some scholars to a time outside the Gawain Poet's era. Thus, ascribing authorship to John Massey is still controversial, and most critics consider the Gawain Poet an unknown.

== Verse form ==
The 2,530 lines and 101 stanzas that make up Sir Gawain and the Green Knight are written in what linguists call the "Alliterative Revival" style of alliterative verse typical of the 14th century. Instead of focusing on a metrical syllabic count and rhyme, the alliterative form of this period usually relied on the agreement of a pair of stressed syllables at the beginning of the line and another pair at the end. Each line always includes a pause, called a caesura, at some point after the first two stresses, dividing it into two half-lines. Although he follows the form of his day, the Gawain Poet was freer with convention than his or her predecessors. The poet broke the alliterative lines into variable-length groups and ended these nominal stanzas with a rhyming section of five lines known as the bob and wheel, in which the "bob" is a very short line, sometimes of only two syllables, followed by the "wheel," longer lines with internal rhyme.

lines 146–150
Original Text

(bob)
ful clene
(wheel)
for wonder of his hwe men hade
set in his semblaunt sene
he ferde as freke were fade
and oueral enker grene

Translation

(bob)
full clean.
(wheel)
Great wonder of the knight
Folk had in hall, I ween,
Full fierce he was to sight,
And over all bright green.

== Similar stories ==
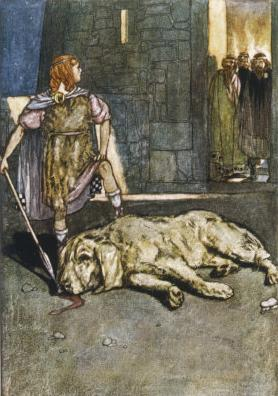
The legendary Irish figure Cúchulainn faced a trial similar to Gawain's (Cúchulain Slays the Hound of Culain by Stephen Reid, 1904).

The earliest known story to feature a beheading game is the 8th-century Middle Irish tale Bricriu's Feast. This story parallels Gawain in that, like the Green Knight, Cú Chulainn's antagonist feints three blows with the axe before letting his target depart without injury. A beheading exchange also appears in the late 12th-century Life of Caradoc, a Middle French narrative embedded in the anonymous First Continuation of Chrétien de Troyes' Perceval, the Story of the Grail. A notable difference in this story is that Caradoc's challenger is his father in disguise, come to test his honour. Lancelot is given a beheading challenge in the early 13th-century Perlesvaus, in which a knight begs him to chop off his head or else put his own in jeopardy. Lancelot reluctantly cuts it off, agreeing to come to the same place in a year to put his head in the same danger. When Lancelot arrives, the people of the town celebrate and announce that they have finally found a true knight, because many others had failed this test of chivalry.

The stories The Girl with the Mule (alternately titled The Mule Without a Bridle) and Hunbaut feature Gawain in beheading game situations. In Hunbaut, Gawain cuts off a man's head and, before he can replace it, removes the magic cloak keeping the man alive, thus killing him. Several stories tell of knights who struggle to stave off the advances of women sent by their lords as a test; these stories include Yder, the Lancelot-Grail, Hunbaut, and The Knight with the Sword. The last two involve Gawain specifically. Usually, the temptress is the daughter or wife of a lord to whom the knight owes respect, and the knight is tested to see whether or not he will remain chaste in trying circumstances.

In the first branch of the medieval Welsh collection of tales known as The Four Branches of the Mabinogi, Pwyll exchanges places for a year with Arawn, the lord of Annwn (the Otherworld). Despite having his appearance changed to resemble Arawn exactly, Pwyll does not have sexual relations with Arawn's wife during this time, thus establishing a lasting friendship between the two men. This story may, then, provide a background to Gawain's attempts to resist the wife of the Green Knight; thus, the story of Sir Gawain and the Green Knight may be seen as a tale which combines elements of the Celtic beheading game and seduction test stories. Additionally, in both stories a year passes before the completion of the conclusion of the challenge or exchange. Some scholars disagree with this interpretation, however, as Arawn seems to have accepted the notion that Pwyll may reciprocate with his wife, making it less of a "seduction test" per se, as seduction tests typically involve a Lord and Lady conspiring to seduce a knight, seemingly against the wishes of the Lord.

After the writing of Sir Gawain and the Green Knight, several similar stories followed. The Greene Knight (15th–17th century) is a rhymed retelling of nearly the same tale. In it, the plot is simplified, motives are more fully explained, and some names are changed. Another story, The Turke and Gowin (15th century), begins with a Turk entering Arthur's court and asking, "Is there any will, as a brother, To give a buffett and take another?" At the end of this poem the Turk, rather than buffeting Gawain back, asks the knight to cut off his head, which Gawain does. The Turk then praises Gawain and showers him with gifts. The Carle of Carlisle (17th century) also resembles Gawain in a scene in which the Carle (Churl), a lord, takes Sir Gawain to a chamber where two swords are hanging and orders Gawain to cut off his head or suffer his own to be cut off. Gawain obliges and strikes, but the Carle rises, laughing and unharmed. Unlike the Gawain poem, no return blow is demanded or given.

== Themes ==
=== Temptation and testing ===
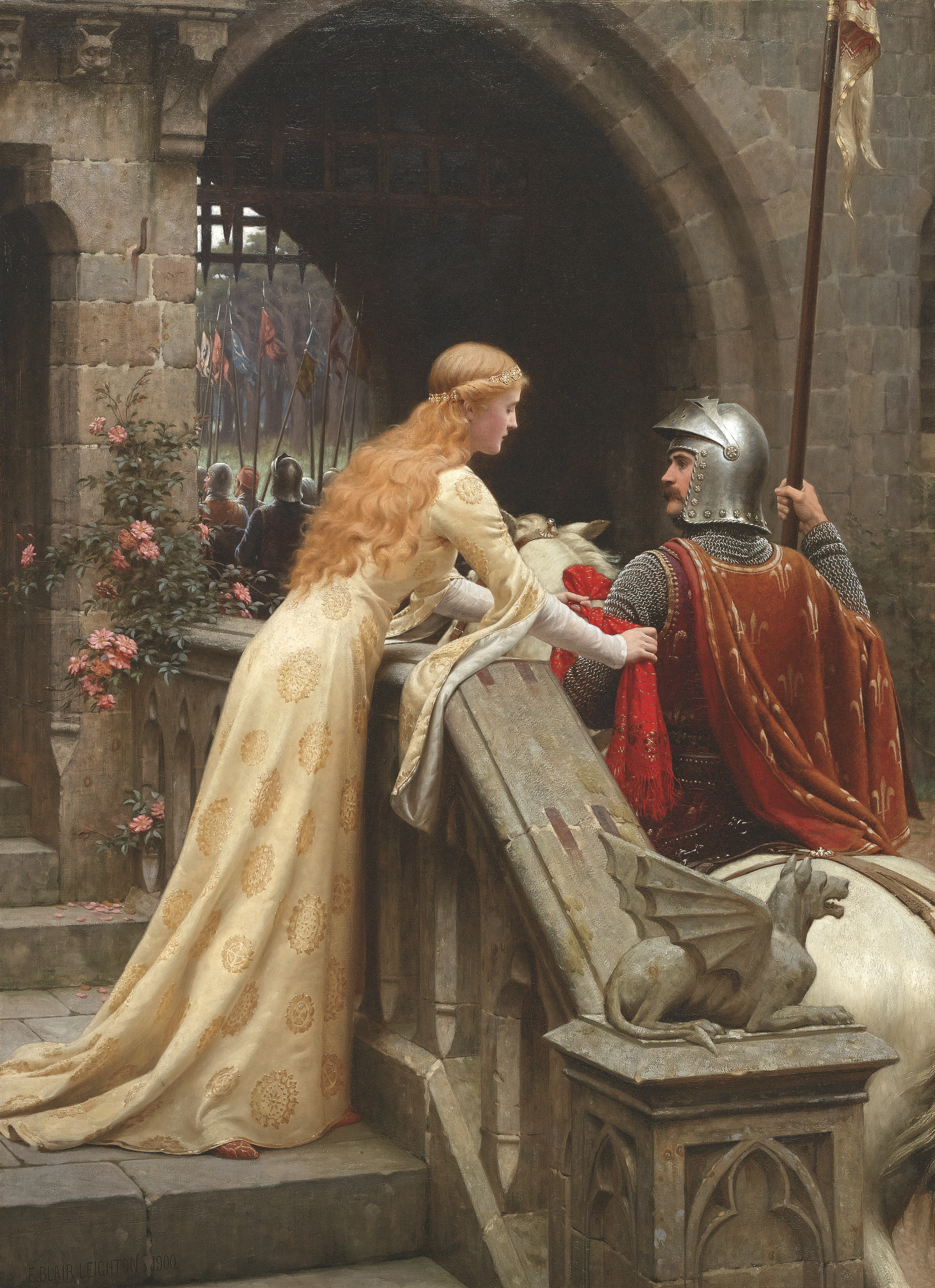
Knights of Gawain's time were tested in their ability to maintain the chivalric code as well as the rules of courtly love. (God Speed! – Edmund Blair Leighton 1900).

At the heart of Sir Gawain and the Green Knight is the test of Gawain's adherence to the code of chivalry. The typical temptation fable of medieval literature presents a series of tribulations assembled as tests or "proofs" of moral virtue. The stories often describe several individuals' failures after which the main character is tested. Success in the proofs will often bring immunity or good fortune. Gawain's ability to pass the tests of his host are of utmost importance to his survival, though he does not know it. It is only by fortuity or "instinctive-courtesy" that Sir Gawain can pass his test. Gawain does not realise, however, that these tests are all orchestrated by the lord, Bertilak de Hautdesert. In addition to the laws of chivalry, Gawain must respect another set of laws concerning courtly love. The knight's code of honour requires him to do whatever a damsel asks. Gawain must accept the girdle from the Lady, but he must also keep the promise he has made to his host that he will give whatever he gains that day. Gawain chooses to keep the girdle out of fear of death, thus breaking his promise to the host but honouring the lady. Upon learning that the Green Knight is actually his host (Bertilak), he realises that although he has completed his quest, he has failed to be virtuous. This test demonstrates the conflict between honour and knightly duties. In breaking his promise, Gawain believes he has lost his honour and failed in his duties.

=== Hunting and seduction ===
Scholars have frequently noted the parallels between the three hunting scenes and the three seduction scenes in Gawain. They are generally agreed that the fox chase has significant parallels to the third seduction scene, in which Gawain accepts the girdle from Bertilak's wife. Gawain, like the fox, fears for his life and is looking for a way to avoid death from the Green Knight's axe. Like his counterpart, he resorts to trickery to save his skin. The fox uses tactics so unlike the first two animals, and so unexpectedly, that Bertilak has the hardest time hunting it. Similarly, Gawain finds the Lady's advances in the third seduction scene more unpredictable and challenging to resist than her previous attempts. She changes her evasive language, typical of courtly love relationships, to a more assertive style. Her dress, modest in earlier scenes, is suddenly voluptuous and revealing.

The deer- and boar-hunting scenes are less clearly connected, although scholars have attempted to link each animal to Gawain's reactions in the parallel seduction scene. Attempts to connect the deer hunt with the first seduction scene have unearthed a few parallels. Deer hunts of the time, like courtship, had to be done according to established rules. Women often favoured suitors who hunted well and skinned their animals, sometimes even watching while a deer was cleaned. The sequence describing the deer hunt is unspecific and nonviolent, with an air of relaxation and exhilaration. The first seduction scene follows in a similar vein, with no overt physical advances and no apparent danger; the entire exchange is humorously portrayed.

The boar-hunting scene is, in contrast, laden with detail. Boars were (and are) much more difficult to hunt than deer; approaching one with only a sword was akin to challenging a knight to single combat. In the hunting sequence, the boar flees but is cornered before a ravine. He turns to face Bertilak with his back to the ravine, prepared to fight. Bertilak dismounts and in the ensuing fight kills the boar. He removes its head and displays it on a pike. In the seduction scene, Bertilak's wife, like the boar, is more forward, insisting that Gawain has a romantic reputation and that he must not disappoint her. Gawain, however, is successful in parrying her attacks, saying that surely, she knows more than he about love. Both the boar hunt and the seduction scene can be seen as depictions of a moral victory: both Gawain and Bertilak face struggles alone and emerge triumphant. Masculinity has also been associated with hunting. The theme of masculinity is present throughout. In an article by Vern L. Bullough, "Being a Male in the Middle Ages," he discusses Sir Gawain and how normally, masculinity is often viewed in terms of being sexually active. He notes that Sir Gawain is not part of this normalcy.

=== Nature and chivalry ===
Some argue that nature represents a chaotic, lawless order which is in direct confrontation with the civilisation of Camelot throughout Sir Gawain and the Green Knight. The green horse and rider that first invade Arthur's peaceful halls are iconic representations of nature's disturbance. Nature is presented throughout the poem as rough and indifferent, constantly threatening the order of men and courtly life. Nature invades and disrupts order in the major events of the narrative, both symbolically and through the inner nature of humanity. This element appears first with the disruption caused by the Green Knight, later when Gawain must fight off his natural lust for Bertilak's wife, and again when Gawain breaks his vow to Bertilak by choosing to keep the green girdle, valuing survival over virtue. Represented by the sin-stained girdle, nature is an underlying force, forever within man and keeping him imperfect (in a chivalric sense). In this view, Gawain is part of a wider conflict between nature and chivalry, an examination of the ability of man's order to overcome the chaos of nature.

Several critics have made exactly the opposite interpretation, reading the poem as a comic critique of the Christianity of the time, particularly as embodied in the Christian chivalry of Arthur's court. In its zeal to extirpate all traces of paganism, Christianity had cut itself off from the sources of life in nature and the female. The green girdle represents all the pentangle lacks. The Arthurian enterprise is doomed unless it can acknowledge the unattainability of the ideals of the Round Table, and, for the sake of realism and wholeness, recognise and incorporate the pagan values represented by the Green Knight.

The chivalry that is represented within Gawain is one which was constructed by court nobility. The violence that is part of this chivalry is steeply contrasted by the fact that King Arthur's court is Christian, and the initial beheading event takes place while celebrating Christmas. The violence of an act of beheading seems to be counterintuitive to chivalric and Christian ideals, and yet it is seen as part of knighthood.

The question of politeness and chivalry is a main theme during Gawain's interactions with Bertilak's wife. He cannot accept her advances or else lose his honour, and yet he cannot utterly refuse her advances or else risk upsetting his hostess. Gawain plays a very fine line and the only part where he appears to fail is when he conceals the green girdle from Bertilak.

=== Games ===
The word gomen (game) is found 18 times in Gawain. Its similarity to the word gome (man), which appears 21 times, has led some scholars to see men and games as centrally linked. Games at this time were seen as tests of worthiness, as when the Green Knight challenges the court's right to its good name in a "Christmas game". The "game" of exchanging gifts was common in Germanic cultures. If a man received a gift, he was obliged to provide the giver with a better gift or risk losing his honour, almost like an exchange of blows in a fight (or in a "beheading game"). The poem revolves around two games: an exchange of beheading and an exchange of winnings. These appear at first to be unconnected. However, a victory in the first game will lead to a victory in the second. Elements of both games appear in other stories; however, the linkage of outcomes is unique to Gawain.

=== Times and seasons ===
Times, dates, seasons, and cycles within Gawain are often noted by scholars because of their symbolic nature. The story starts on New Year's Eve with a beheading and culminates one year later on the next New Year's Day. Gawain leaves Camelot on All Saints Day and arrives at Bertilak's castle on Christmas Eve. Furthermore, the Green Knight tells Gawain to meet him at the Green Chapel in "a year and a day"—in other words, the next New Year's Day. Some scholars interpret the yearly cycles, each beginning and ending in winter, as the poet's attempt to convey the inevitable fall of all things good and noble in the world. Such a theme is strengthened by the image of Troy, a powerful nation once thought to be invincible which, according to the Aeneid, fell to the Greeks because of pride and ignorance. The Trojan connection shows itself in the presence of two nearly identical descriptions of Troy's destruction. The poem's first line reads: "Since the siege and the assault were ceased at Troy" and the final stanzaic line (before the bob and wheel) is "After the siege and the assault were ceased at Troy".

== Symbolism ==
=== The Green Knight ===
Scholars have puzzled over the Green Knight's symbolism since the discovery of the poem. British medievalist C. S. Lewis said the character was "as vivid and concrete as any image in literature" and scholar J. A. Burrow said he was the "most difficult character" to interpret in Sir Gawain. His major role in Arthurian literature is that of a judge and tester of knights, thus he is at once terrifying, friendly, and mysterious. He appears in only two other poems: The Greene Knight and King Arthur and King Cornwall. Scholars have attempted to connect him to other mythical characters, such as Jack in the green of English tradition and to Al-Khidr, but no definitive connection has yet been established.

He represents a mix of two traditional figures in romance and other medieval narratives: "the literary green man" and "the literary wild man." The Green Knight challenges Gawain to rise to the ideals of honour and religious practices. His name, the Green Knight, shows his opposition to nature: the colour green represents forces of nature, and the word "knight" connects him to society and civilisation. While the Green Knight represents the primitive, and uncivilised side of man's nature, he also opposes nature as well. The description of the Green Knight, which he shares with his green horse, shows the central idea of human nature's potential.

=== The colour green ===
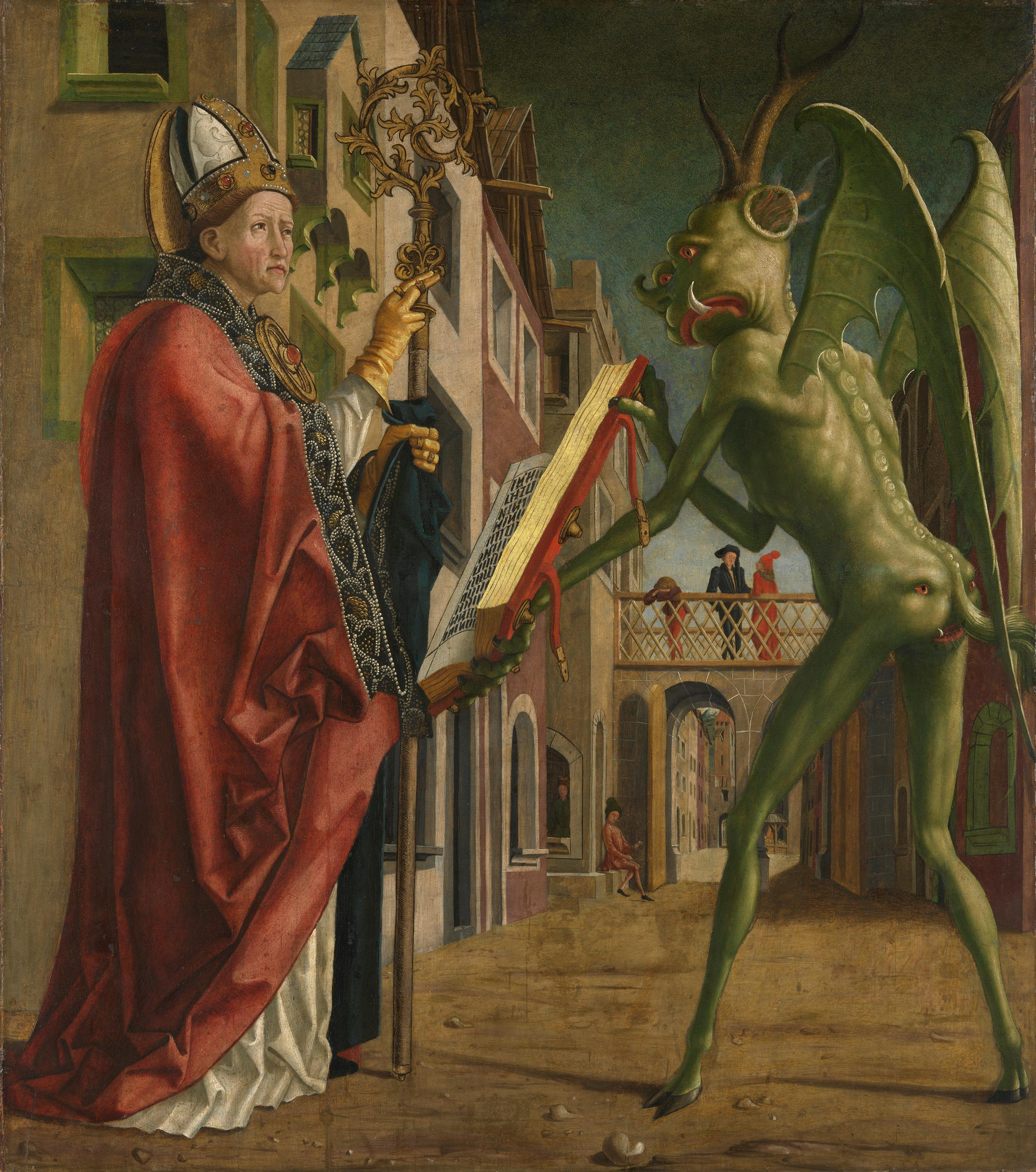
In the 15th-century Saint Wolfgang and the Devil by Michael Pacher, the Devil is green. Poetic contemporaries such as Chaucer also drew connections between the colour green and the devil, leading scholars to draw similar connections in readings of the Green Knight.

Given the varied and even contradictory interpretations of the colour green, its precise meaning in the poem remains ambiguous. In English folklore and literature, green was traditionally used to symbolise nature and its associated attributes: fertility and rebirth. Stories of the medieval period also used it to allude to love and the base desires of man. Because of its connection with faeries and spirits in early English folklore, green also signified witchcraft, devilry and evil. It can also represent decay and toxicity. When combined with gold, as with the Green Knight and the girdle, green was often seen as representing youth's passing. In Celtic mythology, green was associated with misfortune and death, and therefore avoided in clothing. The green girdle, originally worn for protection, became a symbol of shame and cowardice; it is finally adopted as a symbol of honour by the knights of Camelot, signifying a transformation from good to evil and back again; this displays both the spoiling and regenerative connotations of the colour green.

There is a possibility, as Alice Buchanan has argued, that the colour green is erroneously attributed to the Green Knight because of the poet's mistranslation or misunderstanding of the Irish word glas, which could either mean grey or green, or the identical word glas in Cornish. Glas has been used to denote a range of colours: light blues, greys, and greens of the sea and grass.

In the Death of Curoi (one of the Irish stories from Bricriu's Feast), Curoi stands in for Bertilak, and is often called "the man of the grey mantle" which corresponds to Welsh Brenin Llwyd or Gwynn ap Nudd. Though the words usually used for grey in the Death of Curoi are lachtna or odar, roughly meaning milk-coloured and shadowy respectively, in later works featuring a green knight, the word glas is used and may have been the basis of misunderstanding.

=== Girdle ===
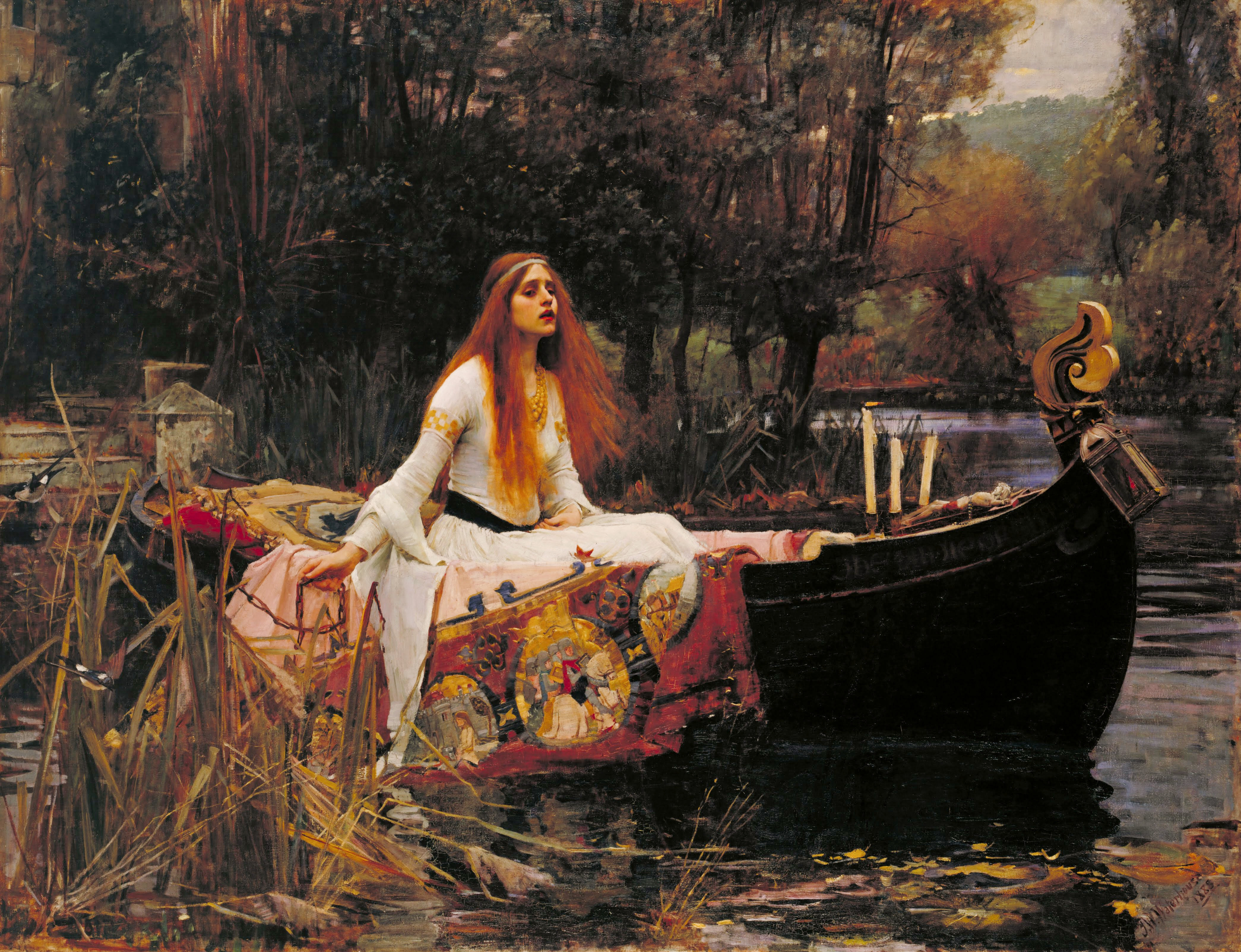
Another famous Arthurian woman, The Lady of Shalott, with a medieval girdle around her waist (John William Waterhouse, 1888)

The girdle's symbolic meaning, in Sir Gawain and the Green Knight, has been construed in a variety of ways. Interpretations range from sexual to spiritual. Those who argue for the sexual inference view the girdle as a "trophy". It is not entirely clear if the "winner" is Sir Gawain or the Lady, Bertilak's wife. The girdle is given to Gawain by the Lady to keep him safe when he confronts the Green Knight. When Bertilak comes home from his hunting trip, Gawain does not reveal the girdle to his host; instead, he hides it. This introduces a spiritual interpretation, that Gawain's acceptance of the girdle is a sign of his faltering faith in God, at least in the face of death. To some, the Green Knight is Christ, who overcomes death, while Gawain is the Every Christian, who in his struggles to follow Christ faithfully, chooses the easier path. In Sir Gawain, the easier choice is the girdle, which promises what Gawain most desires. Faith in God, alternatively, requires one's acceptance that what one most desires does not always coincide with what God has planned. It is arguably best to view the girdle not as an either–or situation, but as a complex, multi-faceted symbol that acts to test Gawain in many ways. While Gawain can resist Bertilak's wife's sexual advances, he is unable to resist the powers of the girdle. Gawain is operating under the laws of chivalry which, evidently, have rules that can contradict each other. In the story of Sir Gawain, Gawain finds himself torn between doing what a damsel asks (accepting the girdle) and keeping his promise (returning anything given to him while his host is away).

=== Pentangle ===
The poem contains the first recorded use of the word pentangle in English. It contains the only representation of such a symbol on Gawain's shield in the Gawain literature. What is more, the poet uses a total of 46 lines to describe the meaning of the pentangle; no other symbol in the poem receives as much attention or is described in such detail. The poem describes the pentangle as a symbol of faithfulness and an endeles knot (endless knot). From lines 640 to 654, the five points of the pentangle relate directly to Gawain in five ways: five senses, his five fingers, his faith found in the five wounds of Christ, the five joys of Mary (whose face was on the inside of the shield) and finally friendship, fraternity, purity, politeness, and piety (traits that Gawain possessed around others). In line 625, it is described as a syngne þat salamon set (a sign set by Solomon). Solomon, the third king of Israel, in the 10th century BC, was said to have the mark of the pentagram on his ring, which he received from the archangel Michael. The pentagram seal on this ring was said to give Solomon power over demons.

Along these lines, some academics link the Gawain pentangle to magical traditions. In Germany, the symbol was called a Drudenfuß (nightmare spirit's foot) and was placed on household objects to keep out evil. The symbol was also associated with magical charms that, if recited or written on a weapon, would call forth magical forces. However, concrete evidence tying the magical pentagram to Gawain's pentangle is scarce.

Gawain's pentangle also symbolises the "phenomenon of physically endless objects signifying a temporally endless quality." Many poets use the symbol of the circle to show infinity or endlessness, but Gawain's poet insisted on using something more complex. In medieval number theory, the number five is considered a "circular number", since it "reproduces itself in its last digit when raised to its powers". Furthermore, it replicates itself geometrically; that is, every pentangle has a smaller pentagon that allows a pentangle to be embedded in it and this "process may be repeated forever with decreasing pentangles". Thus, by reproducing the number five, which in medieval number symbolism signified incorruptibility, Gawain's pentangle represents his eternal incorruptibility.

=== The Lady's ring ===
Gawain's refusal of the Lady's ring has major implications for the remainder of the story. While the modern student may tend to pay more attention to the girdle as the eminent object offered by her, readers in the time of Gawain would have noticed the significance of the offer of the ring as they believed that rings, and especially the embedded gems, had talismanic properties similarly done by the Gawain-poet in Pearl. This is especially true of the Lady's ring, as scholars believe it to be a ruby or carbuncle, indicated when the Gawain-Poet describes it as a bryȝt sunne (fiery sun). This red colour can be seen as symbolising royalty, divinity, and the Passion of the Christ, something that Gawain as a knight of the Round Table would strive for, but this colour could also represent the negative qualities of temptation and covetousness. Given the importance of magic rings in Arthurian romance, this remarkable ring would also have been believed to protect the wearer from harm just as the Lady claims the girdle will.

=== Numbers ===
The poet highlights number symbolism to add symmetry and meaning to the poem. For example, three kisses are exchanged between Gawain and Bertilak's wife; Gawain is tempted by her on three separate days; Bertilak goes hunting three times, and the Green Knight swings at Gawain three times with his axe. The number two also appears repeatedly, as in the two beheading scenes, two confession scenes, and two castles. The five points of the pentangle, the poet adds, represent Gawain's virtues, for he is for ay faythful in fyue and sere fyue syþez (faithful in five and many times five). The poet goes on to list the ways in which Gawain is virtuous: all five of his senses are without fault; his five fingers never fail him, and he always remembers the five wounds of Christ, as well as the five joys of the Virgin Mary. The fifth five is Gawain himself, who embodies the five moral virtues of the code of chivalry: "friendship, generosity, chastity, courtesy, and piety". All of these virtues reside, as the poet says, in þe endeles knot (the endless knot) of the pentangle, which forever interlinks and is never broken. This intimate relationship between symbol and faith allows for rigorous allegorical interpretation, especially in the physical role that the shield plays in Gawain's quest. Thus, the poet makes Gawain the epitome of perfection in knighthood through number symbolism.

The number five is also found in the structure of the poem itself. Sir Gawain is 101 stanzas long, traditionally organised into four 'fitts' of 21, 24, 34, and 22 stanzas. These divisions, however, have since been disputed; scholars have begun to believe that they are the work of the copyist and not of the poet. The surviving manuscript features a series of capital letters added after the fact by another scribe, and some scholars argue that these additions were an attempt to restore the original divisions. These letters divide the manuscript into nine parts. The first and last parts are 22 stanzas long. The second and second-to-last parts are only one stanza long, and the middle five parts are eleven stanzas long. The number eleven is associated with transgression in other medieval literature (being one more than ten, a number associated with the Ten Commandments). Thus, this set of five elevens (55 stanzas) creates the perfect mix of transgression and incorruption, suggesting that Gawain is faultless in his faults.

=== Wounds ===
At the story's climax, Gawain is wounded superficially in the neck by the Green Knight's axe. During the medieval period, the body and the soul were believed to be so intimately connected that wounds were considered an outward sign of inward sin. The neck, specifically, was believed to correlate with the part of the soul related to will, connecting the reasoning part (the head) and the courageous part (the heart). Gawain's sin resulted from using his will to separate reasoning from courage. By accepting the girdle from the lady, he employs reason to do something less than courageous—evade death in a dishonest way. Gawain's wound is thus an outward sign of an internal wound. The Green Knight's series of tests shows Gawain the weakness that has been in him all along: the desire to use his will pridefully for personal gain, rather than submitting his will in humility to God. The Green Knight, by engaging with the greatest knight of Camelot, also reveals the moral weakness of pride in all of Camelot, and therefore all of humanity. However, the wounds of Christ, believed to offer healing to wounded souls and bodies, are mentioned throughout the poem in the hope that this sin of prideful "stiffneckedness" will be healed among fallen mortals.

== Interpretations ==
=== Gawain as medieval romance ===
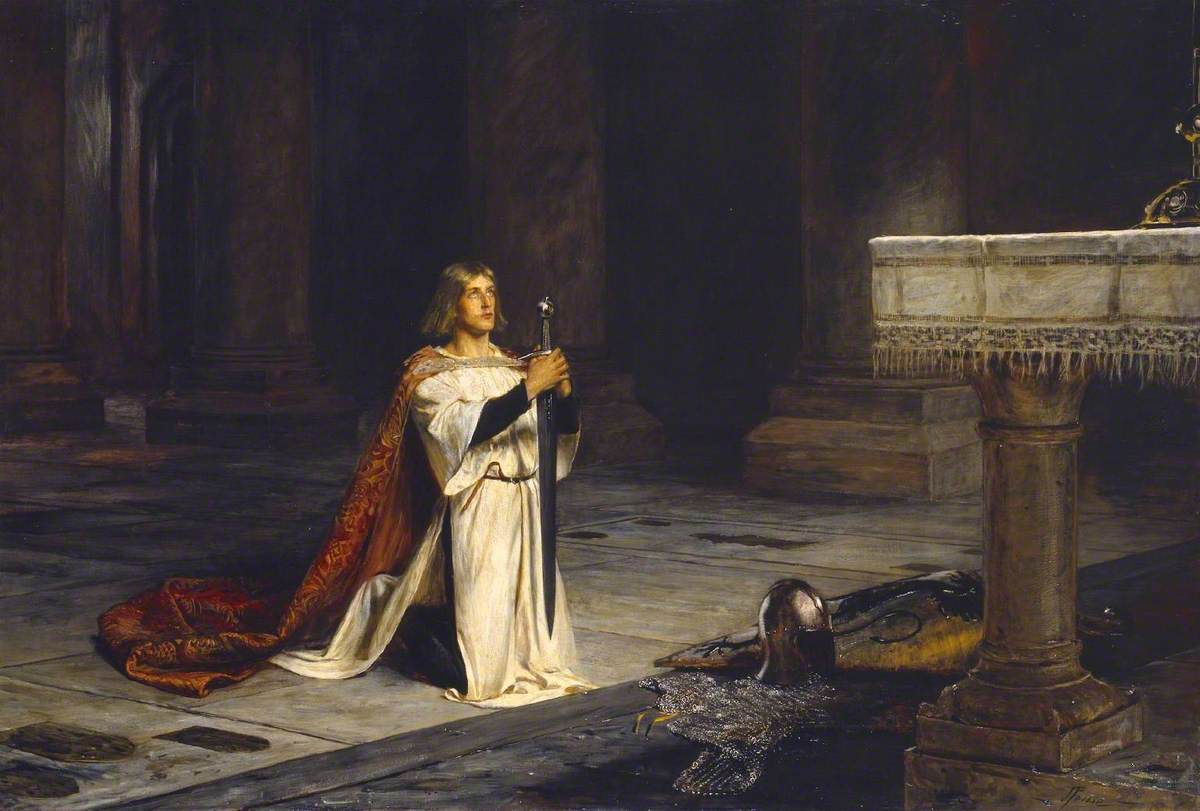
Gawain represented the perfect knight, as a fighter, a lover, and a religious devotee. (The Vigil by John Pettie, 1884).

Many critics argue that Sir Gawain and the Green Knight should be viewed as a romance. Medieval romances typically recount the marvellous adventures of a chivalrous, heroic knight, often of super-human ability, who abides by chivalry's strict codes of honour and demeanour, embarks upon a quest and defeats monsters, thereby winning the favour of a lady. Thus, medieval romances focus not on love and sentiment (as the term "romance" implies today), but on adventure.

Gawain's function, as medieval scholar Alan Markman says, "is the function of the romance hero … to stand as the champion of the human race, and by submitting to strange and severe tests, to demonstrate human capabilities for good or bad action." Through Gawain's adventure, it becomes clear that he is merely human. The reader becomes attached to this human view amidst the poem's romanticism, relating to Gawain's humanity while respecting his knightly qualities. Gawain "shows us what moral conduct is. We shall probably not equal his behaviour, but we admire him for pointing out the way."

In viewing the poem as a medieval romance, many scholars see it as intertwining chivalric and courtly love laws under the English Order of the Garter. A slightly altered version of the Order's motto, "Honi soit qui mal y pense", or "Shamed be he who finds evil here," has been added, in a different hand, at the end of the poem. Some critics describe Gawain's peers wearing girdles of their own as linked to the origin of the Order of the Garter. However, in the parallel poem The Greene Knight, the lace is white, not green, and is considered the origin of the collar worn by the Knights of the Bath, not the Order of the Garter. Still, a possible connection to the Order is not beyond the realm of possibility.

=== Christian interpretations ===
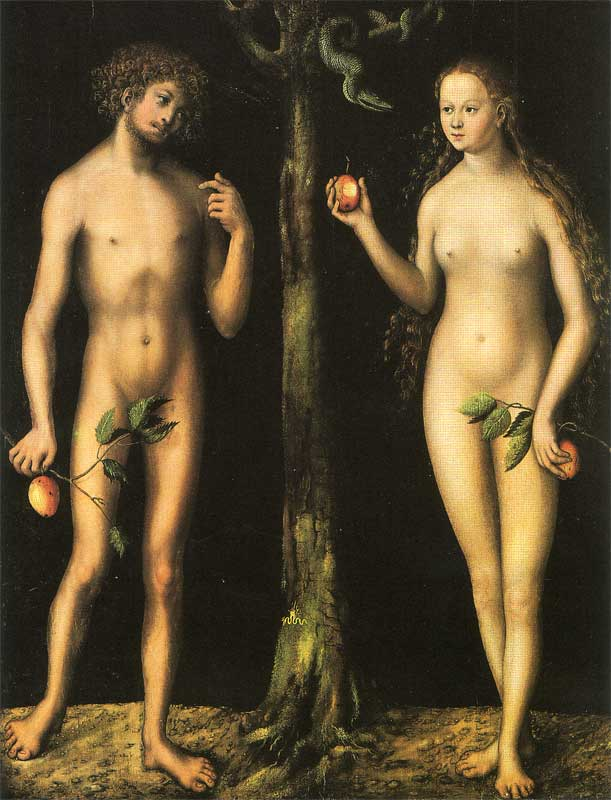
Scholars have pointed out parallels between the girdle Bertilak's wife offers Gawain, and the fruit Eve offered to Adam in the Biblical Garden of Eden. (Adam and Eve Lucas Cranach, c. 1513)

The poem is in many ways deeply Christian, with frequent references to the fall of Adam and Eve and to Jesus Christ. Scholars have debated the depth of the Christian elements within the poem by looking at it in the context of the age in which it was written, coming up with varying views as to what represents a Christian element of the poem and what does not. For example, some critics compare Sir Gawain to the other three poems of the Gawain manuscript. Each has a heavily Christian theme, causing scholars to interpret Gawain similarly. Comparing it to the poem Cleanness (also known as Purity), for example, they see it as a story of the apocalyptic fall of a civilisation, in Gawain's case, Camelot. In this interpretation, Sir Gawain is like Noah, separated from his society and warned by the Green Knight (who is seen as God's representative) of the coming doom of Camelot. Gawain, judged worthy through his test, is spared the doom of the rest of Camelot. King Arthur and his knights, however, misunderstand Gawain's experience and wear garters themselves. In Cleanness the men who are saved are similarly helpless in warning their society of impending destruction.

One of the key points stressed in this interpretation is that salvation is an individual experience difficult to communicate to outsiders. In his depiction of Camelot, the poet reveals a concern for his society, whose inevitable fall will bring about the ultimate destruction intended by God. Gawain was written around the time of the Black Death and Peasants' Revolt, events which convinced many people that their world was coming to an apocalyptic end and this belief was reflected in literature and culture. However, other critics see weaknesses in this view, since the Green Knight is ultimately under the control of Morgan le Fay, often viewed as a figure of evil in Camelot tales. This makes the knight's presence as a representative of God problematic.

While the character of the Green Knight is usually not viewed as a representation of Christ in Sir Gawain and the Green Knight, critics do acknowledge a parallel. Lawrence Besserman, a specialist in medieval literature, explains that "the Green Knight is not a figurative representative of Christ. But the idea of Christ's divine/human nature provides a medieval conceptual framework that supports the poet's serious/comic account of the Green Knight's supernatural/human qualities and actions." This duality exemplifies the influence and importance of Christian teachings and views of Christ in the era of the Gawain Poet.

Furthermore, critics note the Christian reference to Christ's crown of thorns at the conclusion of Sir Gawain and the Green Knight. After Gawain returns to Camelot and tells his story regarding the newly acquired green sash, the poem concludes with a brief prayer and a reference to "the thorn-crowned God". Besserman theorises that "with these final words the poet redirects our attention from the circular girdle-turned-sash (a double image of Gawain's "vntrawþe/renoun": untruth/renown) to the circular Crown of Thorns (a double image of Christ's humiliation turned triumph)."

Throughout the poem, Gawain encounters numerous trials testing his devotion and faith in Christianity. When Gawain sets out on his journey to find the Green Chapel, he finds himself lost, and only after praying to the Virgin Mary does he find his way. As he continues his journey, Gawain once again faces anguish regarding his inevitable encounter with the Green Knight. Instead of praying to Mary, as before, Gawain places his faith in the girdle given to him by Bertilak's wife. From the Christian perspective, this leads to disastrous and embarrassing consequences for Gawain as he is forced to re-evaluate his faith when the Green Knight points out his betrayal. Another interpretation sees the work in terms of the perfection of virtue, with the pentangle representing the moral perfection of the connected virtues, the Green Knight as Christ exhibiting perfect fortitude, and Gawain as slightly imperfect in fortitude by virtue of flinching when under the threat of death.

An analogy is also made between Gawain's trial and the Biblical test that Adam encounters in the Garden of Eden. Adam succumbs to Eve just as Gawain surrenders to Bertilak's wife by accepting the girdle. Although Gawain sins by putting his faith in the girdle and not confessing when he is caught, the Green Knight pardons him, thereby allowing him to become a better Christian by learning from his mistakes. Through the various games played and hardships endured, Gawain finds his place within the Christian world.

=== Feminist interpretations ===
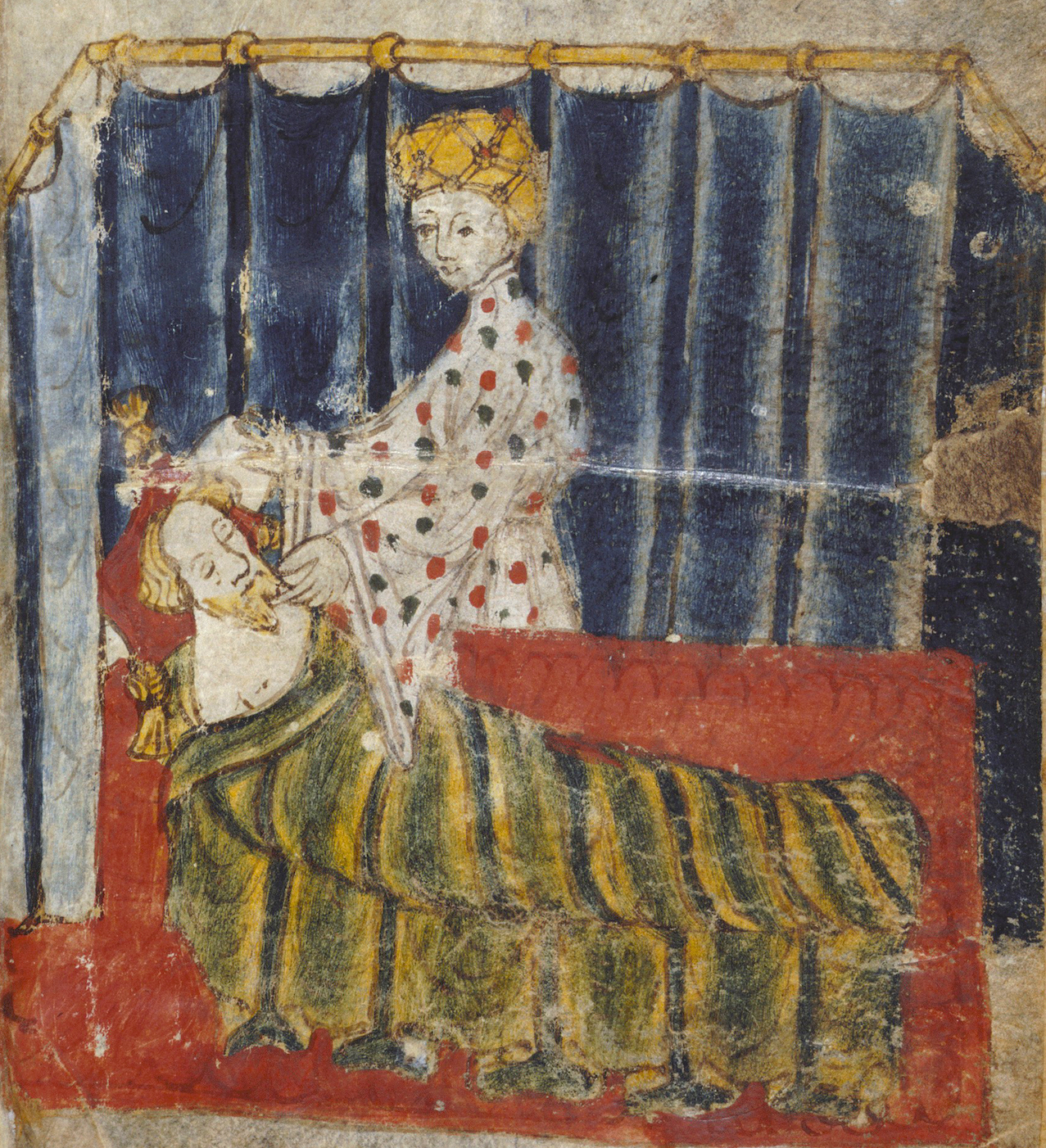
Lady Bertilak at Gawain's bed (from original manuscript, artist unknown)

Feminist literary critics see the poem as portraying women's ultimate power over men. Morgan le Fay and Bertilak's wife, for example, are the most powerful characters in the poem—Morgan especially, as she begins the game by enchanting the Green Knight. The girdle and Gawain's scar can be seen as symbols of feminine power, each of them diminishing Gawain's masculinity. Gawain's misogynist passage, in which he blames all his troubles on women and lists the many men who have fallen prey to women's wiles, further supports the feminist view of ultimate female power in the poem.

In contrast, others argue that the poem focuses mostly on the opinions, actions, and abilities of men. For example, on the surface, it appears that Bertilak's wife is a strong leading character. By adopting the masculine role, she appears to be an empowered individual, particularly in the bedroom scene. This is not entirely the case, however. While the Lady is being forward and outgoing, Gawain's feelings and emotions are the focus of the story, and Gawain stands to gain or lose the most. The Lady "makes the first move", so to speak, but Gawain decides what is to become of those actions. He, therefore, is in charge of the situation and even the relationship.

In the bedroom scene, both the negative and positive actions of the Lady are motivated by her desire. Her feelings cause her to step out of the typical female role and into that of the male, thus becoming more empowered. At the same time, those same actions make the Lady appear adulterous; some scholars compare her with Eve in the Bible. By convincing Gawain to take her girdle, i.e., the apple, the pact made with Bertilak—and therefore the Green Knight—is broken. Based on this, Gawain portrays himself, in what is often called his "antifeminist diatribe" later on, as a "good man seduced".

=== Postcolonial interpretations ===
From 1350 to 1400—the period in which the poem is thought to have been written— there were several Welsh rebellions against English rule, including one by Owain Lawgoch in 1372 and another by Owain Glyndŵr in 1400. The Gawain poet uses a North West Midlands dialect common in the England–Wales border, potentially placing him in the midst of such conflicts. Patricia Clare Ingham is credited with first viewing the poem through the lens of postcolonialism, and since then a great deal of dispute has emerged over the extent to which colonial differences between the English and Welsh play a role in the poem. Most critics agree that gender plays a role but differ about whether it supports the poem's colonial ideals or supplants them as the English and Welsh cultures interact in the poem.

A large amount of critical debate also surrounds the poem as it relates to the bi-cultural political landscape of the time. Some argue that Bertilak is an example of the hybrid Anglo-Welsh culture found on the England–Wales border. They therefore view the poem as a reflection of a hybrid culture that played the two cultures off one another to create a new set of cultural rules and traditions. Other scholars, however, argue that historically there was much violence between the Welsh and English into the 15th century, creating a situation far removed from the more friendly hybridisation suggested by Ingham. To support this argument further, it is suggested that the poem creates an "us versus them" scenario contrasting the knowledgeable and civilised English with the uncivilised borderlands home to Bertilak and the other monsters that Gawain encounters.

In contrast to such postcolonial analyses, others argue that the land of Hautdesert, Bertilak's territory, has been misrepresented or ignored in modern criticism. They suggest that it is a land with its own moral agency, one that plays a central role in the story. Bonnie Lander, for example, argues that the denizens of Hautdesert are "intelligently immoral", choosing to follow certain codes and rejecting others, a position which creates a "distinction … of moral insight versus moral faith". Lander thinks that the border dwellers are more sophisticated because they do not unthinkingly embrace the chivalric codes but challenge them in a philosophical, and—in the case of Bertilak's appearance at Arthur's court—literal sense. Lander's argument about the superiority of the denizens of Hautdesert hinges on the lack of self-awareness present in Camelot, which leads to an unthinking populace that frowns on individualism. In this view, it is not Bertilak and his people, but Arthur and his court, who are the monsters.

=== Gawain's journey ===
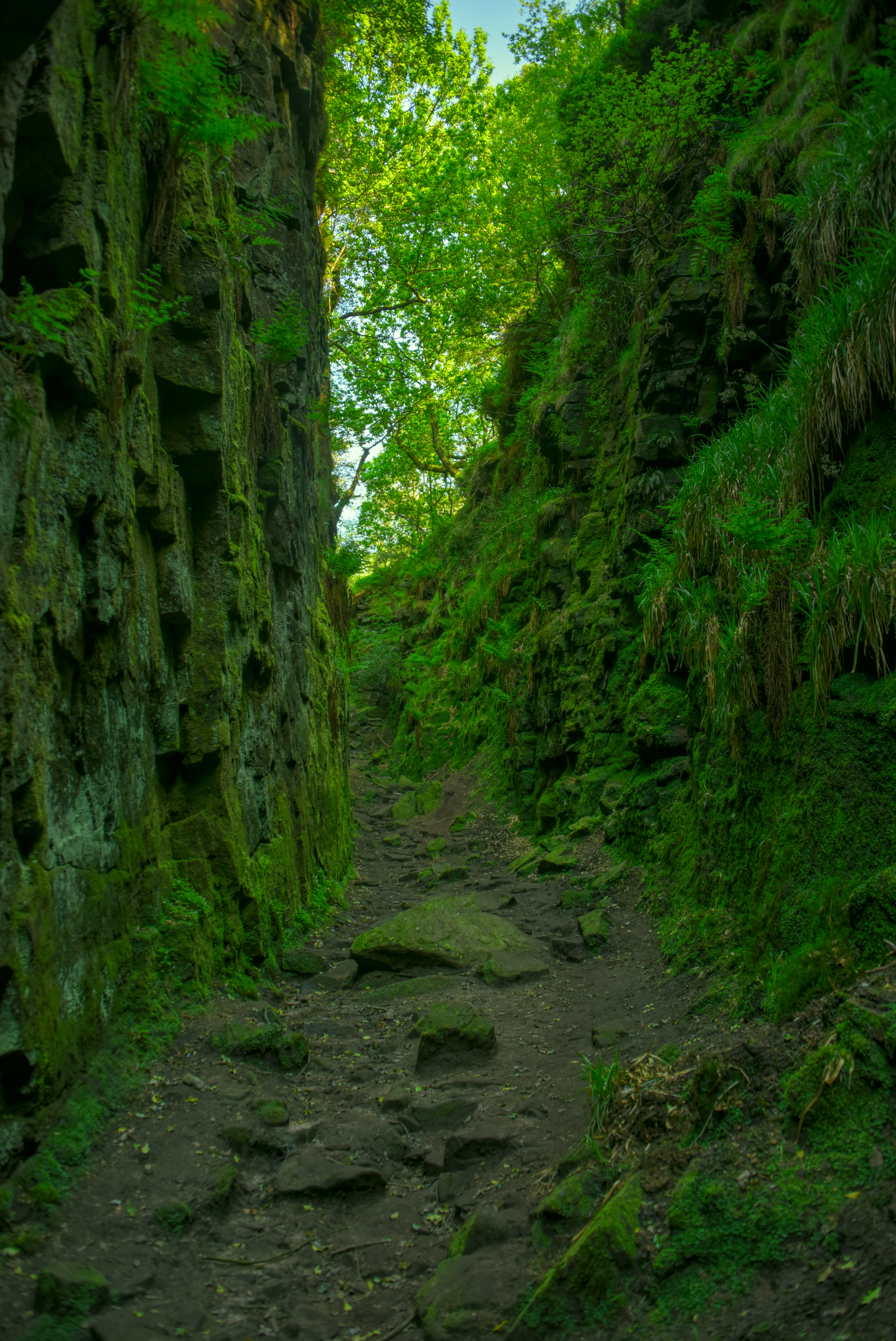
Lud's Church

Several scholars have attempted to find a real-world correspondence for Gawain's journey to the Green Chapel. The Anglesey islands, for example, are mentioned in the poem. They exist today as a single island off the coast of Wales. In line 700, Gawain is said to pass the holy hede (Holy Head), believed by many scholars to be either Holywell or the Cistercian abbey of Poulton in Pulford. Holywell is associated with the beheading of Saint Winifred. As the story goes, Winifred was a virgin who was beheaded by a local leader after she refused his sexual advances. Her uncle, another saint, put her head back in place and healed the wound, leaving only a white scar. The parallels between this story and Gawain's make this area a likely candidate for the journey.

Gawain's trek leads him directly into the centre of the Pearl Poet's dialect region, where the candidates for the locations of the Castle at Hautdesert and the Green Chapel stand. Hautdesert is thought to be in the area of Swythamley in northwest Midland, as it lies in the writer's dialect area and matches the topographical features described in the poem. The area is also known to have housed all of the animals hunted by Bertilak (deer, boar, fox) in the 14th century. The Green Chapel is thought to be in either Lud's Church or Wetton Mill, as these areas closely match the descriptions given by the author. Ralph Elliott located the chapel two myle henne (two miles hence) from the old manor house at Swythamley Park at þe boþem of þe brem valay (the bottom of a valley) on a hillside (loke a littel on þe launde on þi lyfte honde) in an enormous fissure (an olde caue / or a creuisse of an olde cragge). Several have tried to replicate this expedition and others such as Michael W. Twomey have created a virtual tour of Gawain's journey entitled 'Travels with Sir Gawain' that include photographs of landscapes mentioned and particular views mentioned in the text.

=== Homoerotic interpretations ===
According to Queer scholar Richard Zeikowitz, the Green Knight represents a threat to homosocial friendship in his medieval world. Zeikowitz argues that the narrator of the poem seems entranced by the Knight's beauty, homoeroticising him in poetic form. The Green Knight's attractiveness challenges the homosocial rules of King Arthur's court and poses a threat to their way of life. Zeikowitz also states that Gawain seems to find Bertilak as attractive as the narrator finds the Green Knight. Bertilak, however, follows the homosocial code and develops a friendship with Gawain. Gawain's embracing and kissing Bertilak in several scenes thus represents not a homosexual but a homosocial expression. Men of the time often embraced and kissed, and this was acceptable under the chivalric code. Nonetheless, Zeikowitz claims the Green Knight blurs the lines between male homosociality and homosexuality, presumed knowledge of premodern artistic portrayals of female homosociality and homosexuality being largely doubtful, representing the difficulty medieval writers sometimes had in separating the two.

Queer scholar Carolyn Dinshaw argues that the poem may have been a response to accusations that Richard II had a male lover—an attempt to re-establish the idea that heterosexuality was the Christian norm. Around the time the poem was written, the Catholic Church was beginning to express concerns about kissing between males. Many religious figures were trying to make the distinction between strong trust and friendship between males and homosexuality. She asserts that the Pearl Poet seems to have been simultaneously entranced and repulsed by homosexual desire. According to Dinshaw, in his other poem Cleanness, he points out several grievous sins, but spends lengthy passages describing them in minute detail, and she sees this alleged 'obsession' as carrying over to Gawain in his descriptions of the Green Knight.

Beyond this, Dinshaw proposes that Gawain can be read as a woman-like figure. In her view, he is the passive one in the advances of Bertilak's wife, as well as in his encounters with Bertilak himself, where he acts the part of a woman in kissing the man. However, while the poem does have homosexual elements, these elements are brought up by the poet to establish heterosexuality as the normal lifestyle of Gawain's world. The poem does this by making the kisses between the Lady and Gawain sexual in nature but rendering the kisses between Gawain and Bertilak "unintelligible" to the medieval reader. In other words, the poet portrays kisses between a man and a woman as having the possibility of leading to sex, while in a heterosexual world, kisses between a man and a man are portrayed as having no such possibility.

== Modern adaptations ==
=== Books ===
Though the surviving manuscript dates from the fourteenth century, the first published version of the poem did not appear until as late as 1839, when Sir Frederic Madden of the British Museum recognised the poem as worth reading. Madden's scholarly, Middle English edition of the poem was followed in 1898 by the first Modern English translation—a prose version by literary scholar Jessie Weston. In 1925, J. R. R. Tolkien and E. V. Gordon published a scholarly edition of the Middle English text of Sir Gawain and the Green Knight; a revised edition of this text was prepared by Norman Davis and published in 1967. The book, featuring a text in Middle English with extensive scholarly notes, is frequently confused with the translation into Modern English that Tolkien prepared, along with translations of Pearl and Sir Orfeo, late in his life. Many editions of the latter work, first published in 1975, shortly after his death, list Tolkien on the cover as author rather than translator.

Many translations into Modern English are available. Notable translators include Jessie Weston, whose 1898 prose translation and 1907 poetic translation took many liberties with the original; Theodore Banks, whose 1929 translation was praised for its adaptation of the language to modern usage; and Marie Borroff, whose imitative translation was first published in 1967 and "entered the academic canon" in 1968, in the second edition of the Norton Anthology of English Literature. In 2010, her (slightly revised) translation was published as a Norton Critical Edition, with a foreword by Laura Howes. In 2007, Simon Armitage, who grew up near the Gawain poet's purported residence, published a translation which attracted attention in the US and the United Kingdom, and was published in the United States by Norton.

=== Art ===
Many 20th- and 21st-century editions of the poem are, like the manuscript, illustrated. For centuries the poem's titular characters were not the subject of artists' interest, not even for the Pre-Raphaelites, though the poem was the inspiration for Christina Rossetti's "The Prince’s Progress" (1866). This changed in the beginning of the 20th century, with five images by Frederic Lawrence (in an Arts and Crafts style) for a 1912 edition. Herbert Cole illustrated Ernest Rhys and Grace Rhys's English Fairy Tales (1913), and included an image of the Green Knight entering King Arthur's court, the same scene Diana Sudyka represented for the cover of Simon Armitage's 2008 edition of his translation, published by the London Folio Society. British artist and designer Dorothea Braby produced six color engravings for Gwyn Jones's 1952 translation; critic Muriel Whitaker noted that Braby's color scheme points to symbolic dualities, "warmth and coldness, natural and supernatural, courtliness and barbarity, sensuous castle life and rigorous forest hunts". John Howe, known for his work for J. R. R. Tolkien's The Lord of the Rings, created a landscape featuring Gawain and the Green Knight for the jacket cover of Tolkien's translation in HarperCollins' 1996 publication of Sir Gawain and the Green Knight, Pearl, and Sir Orfeo. Commenting on Howe's image, John Gentile notes a connection to the wild man trope, emphasizing the Green Knight's "beard and long hair as well as his holly cluster all show[ing] some connection to the image of the medieval Wild Man". The artist Clive Hicks-Jenkins produced fourteen screenprints for a 2018 special edition of Armitage's translation; these images were also exhibited in 2018 at MOMA Machynlleth art gallery in Wales. Michael Eden comments that, while varied and nuanced, at least five of these images "show a key shift from romance and fairytale-like imagery to a horror aesthetic".

=== Film and television ===
The poem has been adapted to film three times, twice by writer-director Stephen Weeks: first as Gawain and the Green Knight in 1973, which features Nigel Green in his final theatrical film as the Green Knight and Murray Head as Gawain, and again in 1984 as Sword of the Valiant: The Legend of Sir Gawain and the Green Knight, featuring Miles O'Keeffe as Gawain and Sean Connery as the Green Knight. Both films have been criticised for deviating from the poem's plot, described by critic Mark Kermode as "cod antics". Also, Bertilak and the Green Knight are never connected. On 30 July 2021, The Green Knight was released, directed by American filmmaker David Lowery for A24 and starring Dev Patel as Gawain and Ralph Ineson as the Green Knight, albeit with some significant deviations from the original story.

There have been at least two television adaptations, J.M. Phillips’s Gawain and the Green Knight in 1991, adapted by David Rudkin (responsible for folk-horror classic Penda’s Fen) was a TV play made by Thames Television, and the animated Sir Gawain and the Green Knight in 2002. The BBC broadcast a documentary presented by Simon Armitage in which the journey depicted in the poem is traced, using what are believed to be the actual locations. A partial adaptation appears in the Adventure Time episode "Seventeen," which breaks from the original story after the main character, Finn, decapitates the Green Knight.

=== Theatre ===
The Tyneside Theatre company presented a stage version of Sir Gawain and the Green Knight at the University Theatre, Newcastle at Christmas 1971. It was directed by Michael Bogdanov and adapted for the stage from the translation by Brian Stone.

In 1992 Simon Corble created an adaptation with medieval songs and music for The Midsommer Actors' Company. Corble later wrote a substantially revised version which was produced indoors at the O'Reilly Theatre, Oxford in February 2014.

In 2025, an adaptation of Gawain and the Green Knight was staged at the Park Theatre, written by Felix Grainger and Gabriel Fogarty-Graveson.

=== Opera ===
Sir Gawain and the Green Knight was first adapted as an opera in 1978 by the composer Richard Blackford on commission from the village of Blewbury, Oxfordshire. The libretto was written for the adaptation by the children's novelist John Emlyn Edwards. The "Opera in Six Scenes" was subsequently recorded by Decca between March and June 1979 and released on the Argo label in November 1979.

Sir Gawain and the Green Knight was adapted into an opera called Gawain by Harrison Birtwistle, first performed in 1991. Birtwistle's opera was praised for maintaining the complexity of the poem while translating it into lyric, musical form. Another operatic adaptation is Lynne Plowman's Gwyneth and the Green Knight, first performed in 2002. This opera uses Sir Gawain as the backdrop but refocuses the story on Gawain's female squire, Gwyneth, who is trying to become a knight. Plowman's version was praised for its approachability, as its target is the family audience and young children, but criticised for its use of modern language and occasional preachy nature.
