= Edith Scamman =

American botanist (1882–1967)

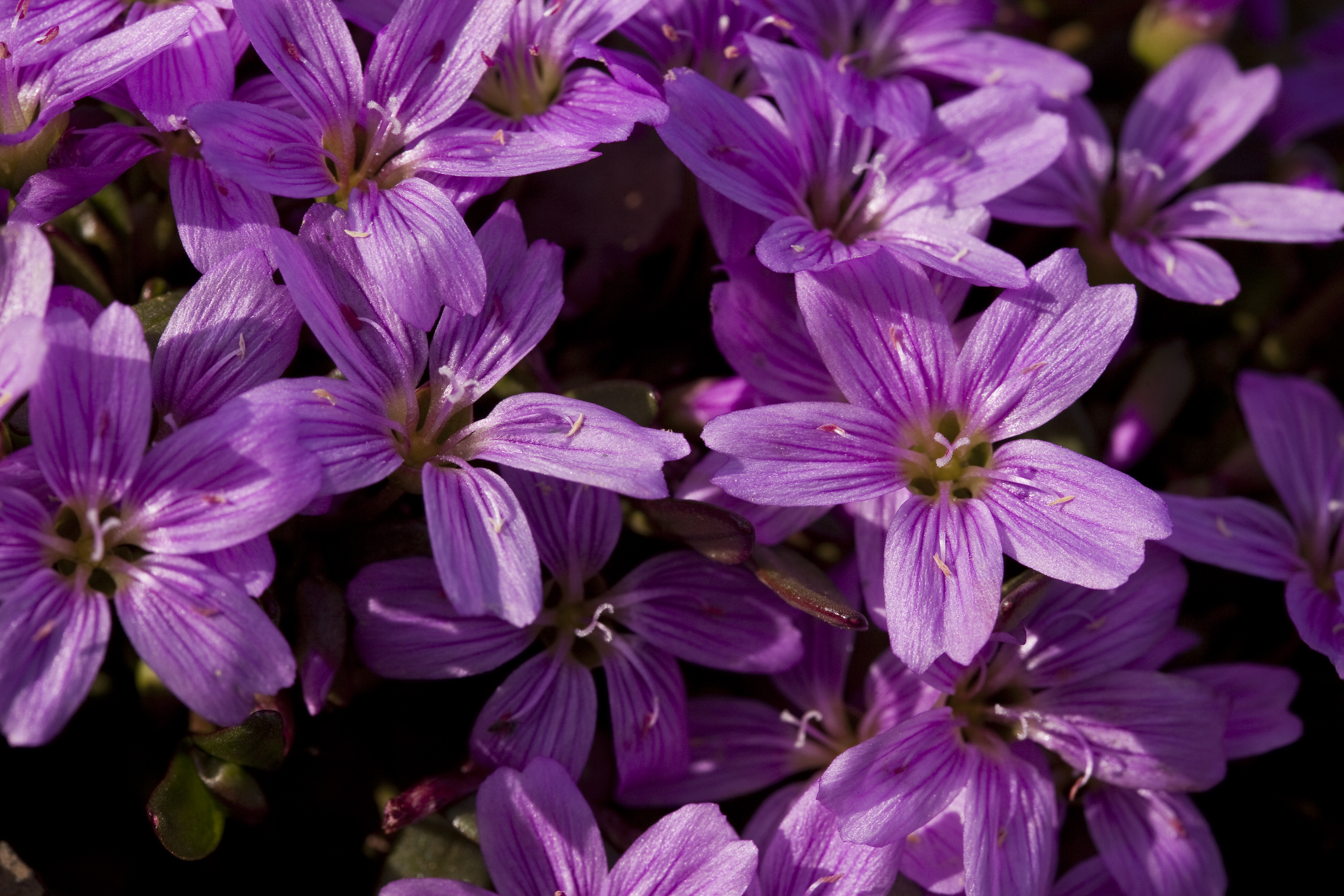
Claytonia scammaniana is one of the plants named after Edith Scamman

Edith Scamman (1882–1967) was an American botanist. She published extensively on ferns and collected samples of thousands of plant species, primarily from Alaska and Costa Rica.

== Early life and education ==
Scamman was born in Saco, Maine, on 30 November 1882, to Henry Scamman, who had been a banker in the California gold rush of the 1950s, and his wife Francesca. Educated at Thornton Academy, she earned a BA in English from Wellesley College in 1907 and an MA in literature from Radcliffe College in 1909. Her thesis on the Middle English alliterative poem ‘Death and Liffe’ was published by the college in 1910. After a time working at her church and caring for her mother, she returned to Radcliffe to study science. She spent the summer of 1939 at the Oxford University Herbarium in England.

== Botany ==
Between 1936 and 1954, Scamman made nine plant collecting journeys to Alaska, including the remote Eagle Point, where she collected over 5000 specimens. This was the first significant plant collection in Alaska and contained two previously unknown species which were named after her: Scamman’s Spring Beauty and Scamman’s Oxytrope.

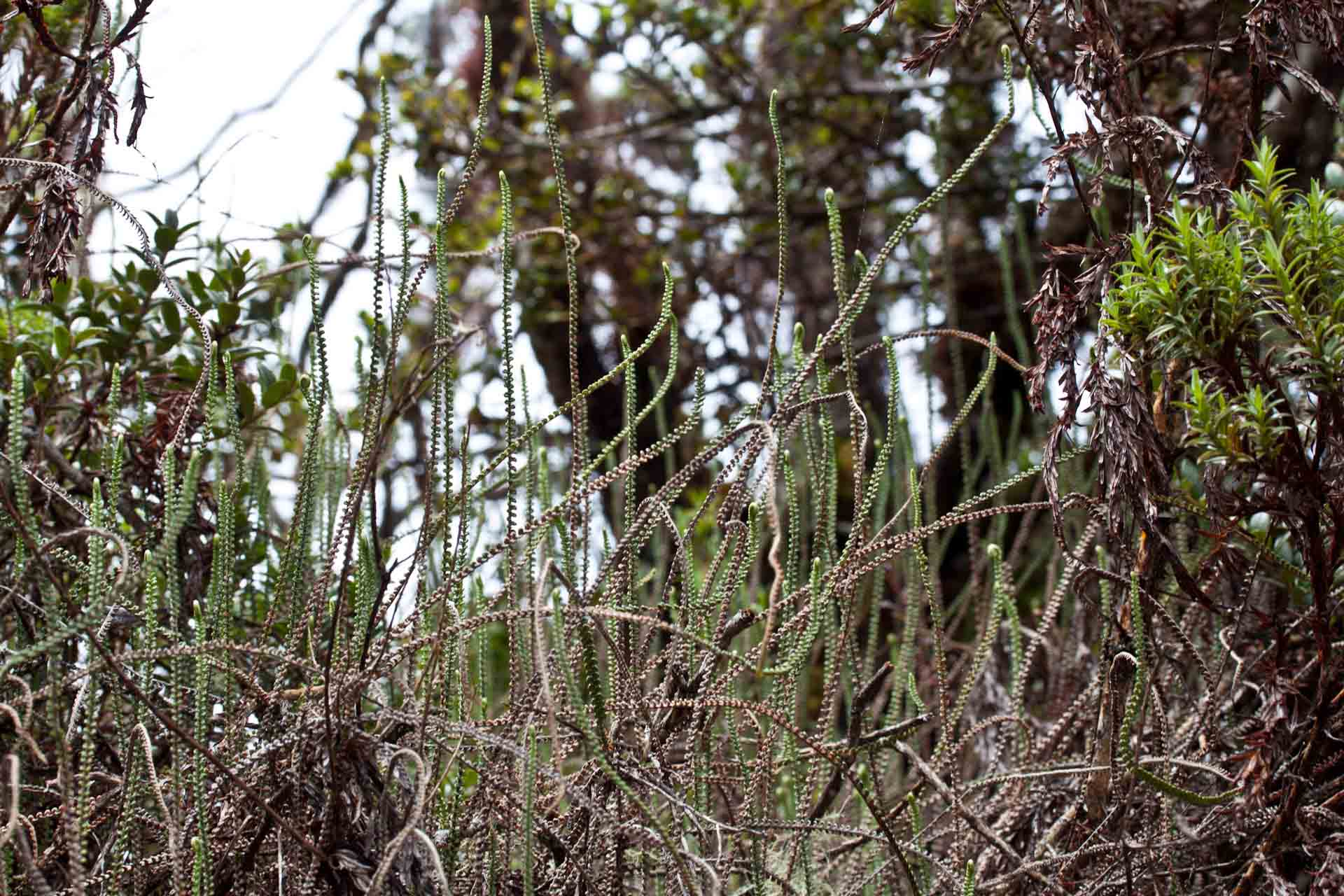
Jamsonia scammaniae

In the 1940s, she published on ferns. Across four collecting trips between 1951 and 1956, collected over 500 specimens of the ferns of Costa Rica, one of which, Jamesonia scammaniae, was named after her. She served as secretary of the American Fern Society and was a member of the Society’s Overseers Committee, which visited the Gray Herbarium from 1942–6.

She was appointed a research associate in the Gray Herbarium in 1949 and an honorary research associate there in 1962.

Scamman was the author of numerous articles on ferns and the monograph Ferns and Fern Allies of New Hampshire (1947).

== Personal life and death ==
Scamman continued to work for her church and served as president of the Missionary Council of the Congregational Church Women of Maine from 1940–1944.

She died on 4 November 1967 in Cambridge, Massachusetts, leaving her house in Saco to Thornton Academy, which added an Edith Scamman Science Building in her honour.
