= Laura Howes =

American scholar of Middle English literature

Laura Howes is an American scholar of Middle English literature. She is the author of Chaucer's Gardens and the Language of Convention (1998) and the editor, with Marie Borroff, of the Norton Critical Edition of Sir Gawain and the Green Knight (2010). Howes received her B.A. from Cornell University and her M.A. and Ph.D. from Columbia University, and is Professor of English at the University of Tennessee.

== Publications ==
- Howes, Laura L. (1997). Chaucer's Gardens and the Language of Convention. Gainesville: UP of Florida. ISBN 9780813015064.
- Howes, Laura L. (2002). "'The Slow Curve of the Footwalker': Narrative Time and Literary Landscapes in Middle English Poetry". In John Howe (ed.). Inventing Medieval Landscapes: Senses of Place in Western Europe. Michael Wolfe. Gainesville: UP of Florida. pp. 192–207. ISBN 9780813024790.
- Howes, Laura L.; Borroff, Marie (2010). Sir Gawain and the Green Knight. Norton Critical Editions. New York: Norton. ISBN 9780393930252.
