= Death and Liffe =

Middle English alliterative poem

Death and Liffe (or Death and Life) is a Middle English alliterative poem. Framed as a dream vision, the poem recounts a debate between personified Dame Death and Lady Life. Dame Death boasts that she has conquered humankind, but Lady Life argues that Jesus Christ has won eternal life for humanity through his death and resurrection. The poem is preserved in the seventeenth-century Percy Folio. It is thought to have been written in the north of England in about the fourteenth century.

== Contents ==
The poem consists of 458 lines and opens and closes with prayers. It opens with the narrator walking in a May landscape before he falls asleep. In his dream-vision, he sees a beautiful woman, Lady Life, arriving with a large retinue. Dame Death arrives and attacks Life's company. Life revives her followers who had been killed and asserts that Death's power is only temporary, prompting a debate between the two. Dame Death boasts about the people she has struck down, from Adam to the knights of King Arthur. Lady Life recounts how Death had been vanquished by the Resurrection: Death's spear wound to Christ's side released Life, who was contained within. Christ and Life enact the Harrowing of Hell, banishing Death to hell and releasing the Old Testament saints from there. Lady Life points her followers towards baptism and the Creed, saying that if they love the Lord they need not fear death. She departs with her followers, and the narrator, attempting to follow them, awakes from the dream.

== Analysis ==
The poem shows a continued interest in alliterative poetry in Middle English later than the Pearl poet, who was also working in the north of England. It includes several tropes of Middle English poetry such as the dream vision, allegory, debate poetry, the everyman narrator, and the conventional May scene of the frame device. It plays into the medieval artistic preoccupation with death against the backdrop of the Black Death, including a tradition of feminine portrayals of Death. The poem's subject matter has been compared to Piers Plowman B.18, which also treats the Harrowing of Hell.

== Date ==
The Routledge Encyclopedia says that 'Although the date of the poem is uncertain, its assured style would seem to place it well within the mainstream of alliterative tradition late in the 14th century'. Hanford and Steadman's philological analysis placed it in the north of England ‘before 1450’. Donatelli proposes a late-fourteenth or early-fifteen-century date.

== Editions ==
- Hanford, James Holly and John Marcellus Steadman Jr, ‘Death and Liffe: An Alliterative Poem’, Studies in Philology 15:3 (1918), 221–294
- Gollancz, Israel, Death and Liffe: A Medieval Alliterative Debate Poem in a Seventeenth-Century Version (London, 1930)
- Donatelli, Joseph ed., Death and Liffe (Cambridge, 1989)

== Secondary literature ==
- Scamman, Edith, ‘The Alliterative Poem: Death and Liffe’, Radcliffe Studies in English and Comparative Literature 15 (1910), 95–113
- Hanford, James Holly, ‘Dame Nature and Lady Life’, Modern Philology 15 (1917), 313–6.
- Harrington, David, ‘The Personifications in “Death and Liffe”, a Middle-English Poem’, Neuphilologische Mitteilungen 68:1 (1967), 35–47
- Fein, Susanna, ‘The Poetic Art of Death and Life’, YLS 2 (1988), 103–23
- Asher, Lyell, ‘Life against Death in “Death and Liffe”’, Christianity and Literature 50:2 (2001), 207–224
- Jefferson, Judith and Ad Putter, ‘Alliterative Metre and Editorial Practice: The Case of Death and Liffe’ in Judith Jefferson and Ad Putter, eds., Approaches to the Metres of Alliterative Verse, Leeds Texts and Monographs New Series 17 (2009), pp. 269–292
