= Percy Folio =

Folio book of English ballads

The Percy Folio is a folio book of English ballads used by Thomas Percy to compile his Reliques of Ancient English Poetry. Although the manuscript itself was compiled in the 17th century, some of its material goes back well into the 12th century. It was the most important of the source documents used by Francis James Child for his 1883 collection The English and Scottish Popular Ballads.

== The manuscript ==
Those who owned the manuscript before Percy did not treat it well; its owners had probably regarded its Middle English and border dialect as incomprehensible and worthless. When Percy first came across the manuscript, in the house of its former owner Humphrey Pitt at Shifnal, Shropshire, pages were being used by his housemaids to start fires. Percy had the manuscript bound, and the bookbinder inflicted additional damage in trimming the edges of the sheets, losing first or last lines on many pages. Percy did not treat the manuscript particularly well himself; he wrote notes and comments in it and tore out some pages after binding.

The original folio is in the British Library, call number Additional MS. 27879. In its present form the manuscript consists of some 520 paper pages, containing 195 individual items. The works were transcribed in the middle decades of the 17th century. The handwriting in the manuscript appears to be the same throughout and bears some similarity with that of Thomas Blount but it cannot be determined for certain whether he originally collected the work. The loose leaves that comprise the manuscript are now individually mounted and covered with gauze.

== Contents ==
In addition to the ballads culled and compiled by Percy and Child, the folio contains an alliterative poem in Middle English entitled Death and Liffe and Scottish Feilde, which is a poem on the Battle of Flodden. The manuscript contains ballads, for the most part, but also metrical romances such as Sir Degaré and The Squire of Low Degree. There are several Arthurian texts, including King Arthur and King Cornwall, Sir Lancelott of Dulake, The Marriage of Sir Gawain, Merline, The Carle of Carlisle, The Greene Knight, The Boy and the Mantle and The Turke and Gowin. The last three narratives are entirely unknown outside the Percy Folio. The manuscript also preserves eight Robin Hood ballads: "Robin Hood's Death", "Robin Hood and Guy of Gisborne", "Robin Hood and the Curtal Friar", "Robin Hood and the Butcher", "The Jolly Pinder of Wakefield", "Little John a Begging", "Robin Hood Rescuing Three Squires", and "Robin Hood and Queen Katherine".

== Reception and significance ==
Percy published several pieces from the manuscript, many of which were "repaired" or frankly rewritten, especially in his Reliques of Ancient English Poetry, but did not allow fellow historians access to the original manuscript during his lifetime.

Percy's book was the constant companion of Gottfried August Bürger, a childhood hero of Novalis, one of the chief influences of George MacDonald, whom C.S. Lewis considered his master. And thus the manuscript, through Percy's book had a direct line of influence on Lewis's works.

Despite its losses, the Percy Folio ranks alongside the Exeter Book, the Pearl Manuscript, and the Cotton library's monstrarum librarum of the Beowulf manuscript as one of the most important documents in English poetry. A full edition of the folio's contents was not published until 1867, with a supplement of "loose and humorous" songs the following year.
