= The Greene Knight =

Late medieval rhyming romance

The Greene Knight is a late medieval rhyming romance found in the Percy Folio Manuscript. The storyline effectively parallels the more famous Sir Gawain and the Green Knight in describing the dealings of Gawain, King Arthur's nephew, with the Greene Knight.

The text was edited by Thomas Hahn for the Camelot Project. Key differences offered as examples by Hahn from the longer poem include rapid pacing, more explicit character motivations, and a rhyme scheme more suitable for popular recitation. Hahn concludes "In many ways, in fact, The Greene Knight, as the later poem, seems almost a summary or guide in its determined spelling out of motives and events, its domestication of the challenging and mysterious, and its explanation of marvels and ambiguities." Hahn writes, "The language of The Greene Knight suggests that it was originally composed about 1500 in the South Midlands. It is marked for two fitts (perhaps indicating performance sessions), and falls into eighty-six tail-rhyme stanzas, running aabccb."
