= The Turke and Gowin =

Middle English Arthurian ballad

1868 edition of the Percy Folio, where the ballad is preserved

The Turke and Gowin (or The Turke and Sir Gawain) is a Middle English Arthurian ballad about Sir Gawain. It is a story of Gowin's adventures on the Isle of Man with a mysterious companion, the 'Turk'. It is preserved in the seventeenth-century Percy folio, but is thought to have been written in the late fourteenth or early fifteenth century in the north of England.

== Plot ==
The manuscript is missing the bottom half of each of its pages, which were torn out to light fires, making the story sometimes unclear. It consists of 337 surviving lines.

A ‘Turk’, or dwarf, arrives at King Arthur’s court and demands an exchange of blows. Sir Kay responds angrily, but Gowin (Sir Gawain) responds diplomatically. The Turk promises to return Gowin’s blow, but first he will make him ‘thrice as feared’ as any other man before they return. Gowin promises to travel with him.

The Turk leads Gowin to a hill, which opens and closes behind them amid supernatural storms. The Turk forbids Gowin to eat the food they find there. Gowin asks that the Turk deliver the return blow so that he can conclude their agreement and go home.

Instead, the Turk brings Gowin to the Isle of Man and the castle of the heathen King of Man. The King produces seventeen giants, who challenge Gowin to games with a 'tennisse ball', a fireplace, and a cauldron of boiling lead. Using his supernatural strength and a garment of invisibility, the Turk carries out the challenges and kills the giants. He throws the King of Man into the fire.

The Turk asks Gowin to behead him and let his blood run into a golden basin. When his blood hits the basin, there stands a knight, Sir Gromer, in his place. They return to the court of King Arthur, bringing with them seventeen ladies who had been imprisoned in the castle. Sir Gromer asks that King Arthur make Gowin King of Man, but Gowin grants this honour to Sir Gromer instead.

== Reception ==
The ‘Turk’ has been interpreted as an alien or outsider figure, ‘an indeterminate Orientalist stereotype of difference and exoticism’. This motif of the exotic outsider arriving to begin an adventure features in several tales about Sir Gawain, and is more fully explored in Sir Gawain and the Green Knight, which also features an agreement to exchange blows. The poem features several other common medieval tropes, such as the taboo against eating food.

The poem contains references to a ‘tenisse ball’, suggesting a fifteenth-century awareness of tennis in England.

== Editions ==
- Madden, Frederic (1839)
- Hales, John and Frederick Furnivall, Percy's Folio Manuscript (1868)
- Williams, Jean Myrle Wilson, 'A Critical Edition of "The Turke & Gowin", Dissertation Abstracts International 49 (1988)
- Hahn, Thomas, ed., Sir Gawain: Eleven Romances and Tales (1995)
