= St Andrew's Church, Plaistow =

Church in Plaistow, London, England

Coordinates: 51°31′28″N 0°01′40″E

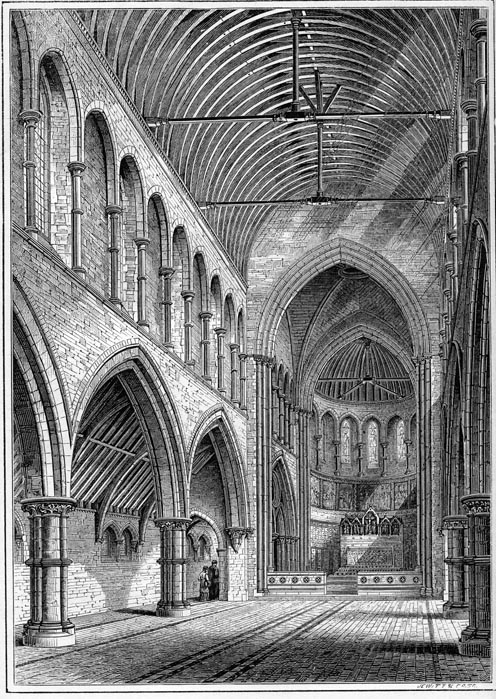
Interior of St Andrew's Church, Plaistow - frontispiece of Charles L Eastlake, A History of the Gothic Revival. London: Longmans, Green; N.Y. Scribner, Welford, 1872.

St Andrew's Church was a Church of England church on Barking Road in Plaistow, east London. It began as a small mission built in 1860 on Whitwell Road by St Mary's Church, Plaistow. A permanent church designed by James Brooks opened in 1870 on a site just south of the northern outfall sewer embankment and a separate parish assigned to it the following year. A large central crossing tower with a pyramidal spire was planned but only completed as far as the ridge of the nave roof.

In 1903 the church opened the mission hall that later became St Cedd's Church, Canning Town - the mission district for it was split off from the parishes of St Andrew's and St Luke's. St Andrew's suffered heavy damage during the London Blitz but was extensively repaired after 1945. The building was Grade II listed in 1984 but is no longer an Anglican church, now housing offices and a UCKG Help Centre and with its chancel walled off. Its parish is now within the Parish of the Divine Compassion. In 2006, the congregation of St Andrew's Church, Plaistow merged into the congregation of Memorial Baptist Church to form one group, the Memorial Community Church.
