= St Erkenwald's Church, Barking =

Church in Barking, London

Coordinates: 51.5435°N 0.0945°E

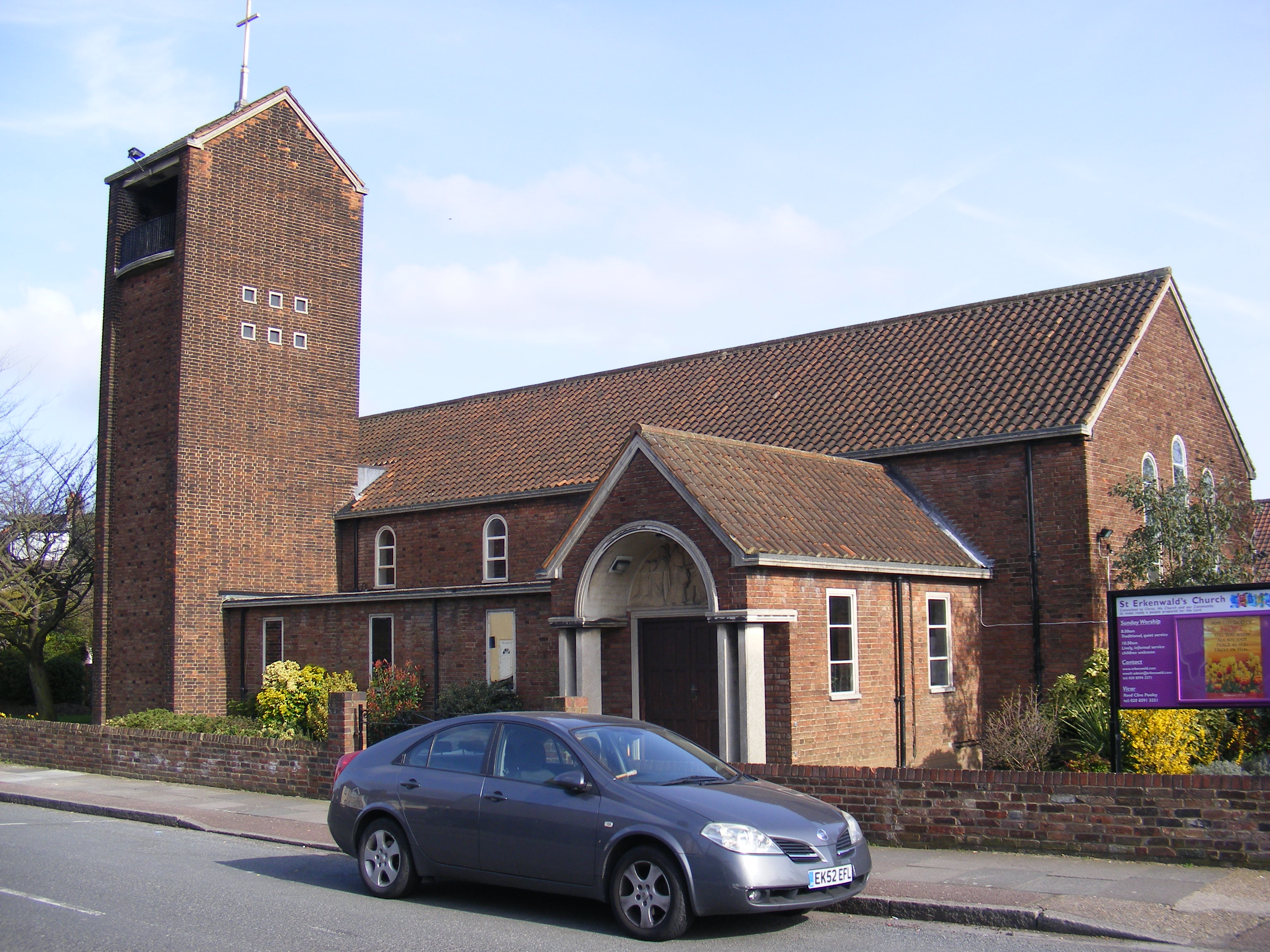
St Erkenwald's Church

St Erkenwald's Church is a Church of England parish church on Levett Road, Barking in Greater London. It was established as a temporary church in 1934, which was only replaced by a permanent red-brick church twenty years later – the latter was part-funded by money from a War Damage payment for Holy Trinity Church, Canning Town, destroyed in the London Blitz. It is dedicated to Earconwald, one of the founders of Barking Abbey and brother to its first abbess Ethelburga.
