= St Cedd's Church, Canning Town =

Church in London, England

Coordinates: 51.5178°N 0.0268°E

St Cedd's Church was a Church of England church between Newham Way, (front, original access, was Beckton Road at time of building) and Chadwin Road, (access after the development of the Newham Way in the 1960s) in Canning Town, east London, dedicated to Cedd, evangelist to Essex, in whose ceremonial county the church falls. Opened as a brick hall in 1903-1904 as a mission of St Andrew's Church, Plaistow, it had a mission district assigned using parts of the parishes of St Andrew's and St Luke's in 1905. That mission district was turned into a separate parish in 1936, for which a new redbrick church was completed in 1939. Part of the former parish of Holy Trinity Church was assigned to St Cedd's in 1961, though the latter is no longer an Anglican church. Fire damaged in 1995, it was restored and re-opened in 2007 to house the London Ghana Seventh-day Adventist congregation
