= St Erkenwald (poem) =

14th-century alliterative poem

- by ? The Pearl Poet
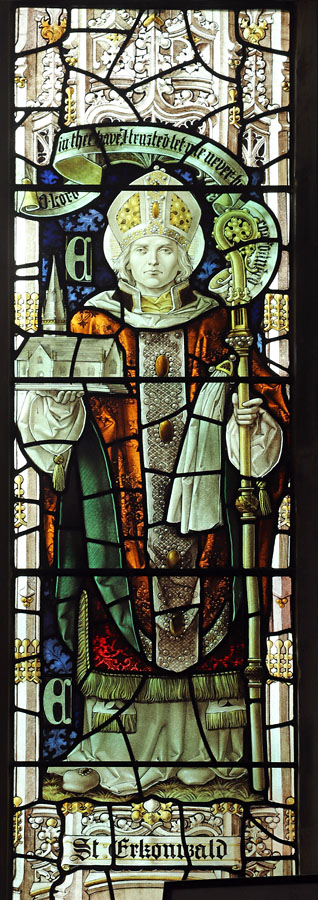
- Erkenwald window - Long Melford, Holy Trinity Church
- First published in: Mid- to late 15th century
- Country: England
- Language: Middle English
- Subject(s): Theology and statecraft
- Genre: Alliterative verse

St Erkenwald is a fourteenth-century alliterative poem in Middle English, perhaps composed in the late 1380s or early 1390s. It has sometimes been attributed, owing to the Cheshire/Shropshire/Staffordshire Dialect in which it is written, to the Pearl poet who probably wrote the poems Pearl, Patience, Cleanness, and Sir Gawain and the Green Knight.

St Erkenwald imagines an encounter in the seventh century between the historical Erkenwald, Bishop of London 675 to 693, and a corpse from an even earlier period, the period before the Roman conquest of Britain. The poem's themes revolve around the complex history of Britain and England, and the possibility in fourteenth-century Christian thought of the salvation of virtuous pagans.

== Manuscript ==
St Erkenwald survives in only one manuscript, British Library MS Harley 2250. The document was discovered in 1757 by Thomas Percy; the manuscript had been in the possession of Sir Humphrey Pitt of Balcony House, Shifnal, and Priorslee, Shropshire. Other important ancient literary materials narrowly avoided being burnt as kindling by household staff in the circumstances in which Percy was discovering this important cultural survival.

This is a composite manuscript, created by binding together two pre-existing manuscripts which were originally unrelated. One of the other texts in the part which contains St Erkenwald, copied by the same scribe, ends with a scribal colophon noting the year, 1477; since this note is by the same scribe, the copy of St Erkenwald therefore dates from in or around 1477, roughly a century after the poem's probable composition.

The first line of the surviving copy of the poem begins with a rubricated large initial "A", and line 177 begins with a similar letter "T". Since this copy of the poem as a whole has 352 lines, the line 177 marks the beginning of its second half, and the marking of this point in the poem is probably intentional. Modern editions have therefore tended to reproduce the division.

The rest of the related part of the manuscript contains many other works of a pious and devotional sort, including at least ten other stories about saints in Middle English verse (albeit rhyming verse rather than alliterative verse): although St Erkenwald has usually been edited or anthologised in isolation, the surviving copy appears to have been transmitted as part of a collection of saintly writings.

The title of the poem in its manuscript copy is the Latin "De Erkenwaldo" ("About Erkenwald"); the poem's present-day title, St Erkenwald, is a modern imposition.

== Poetics ==
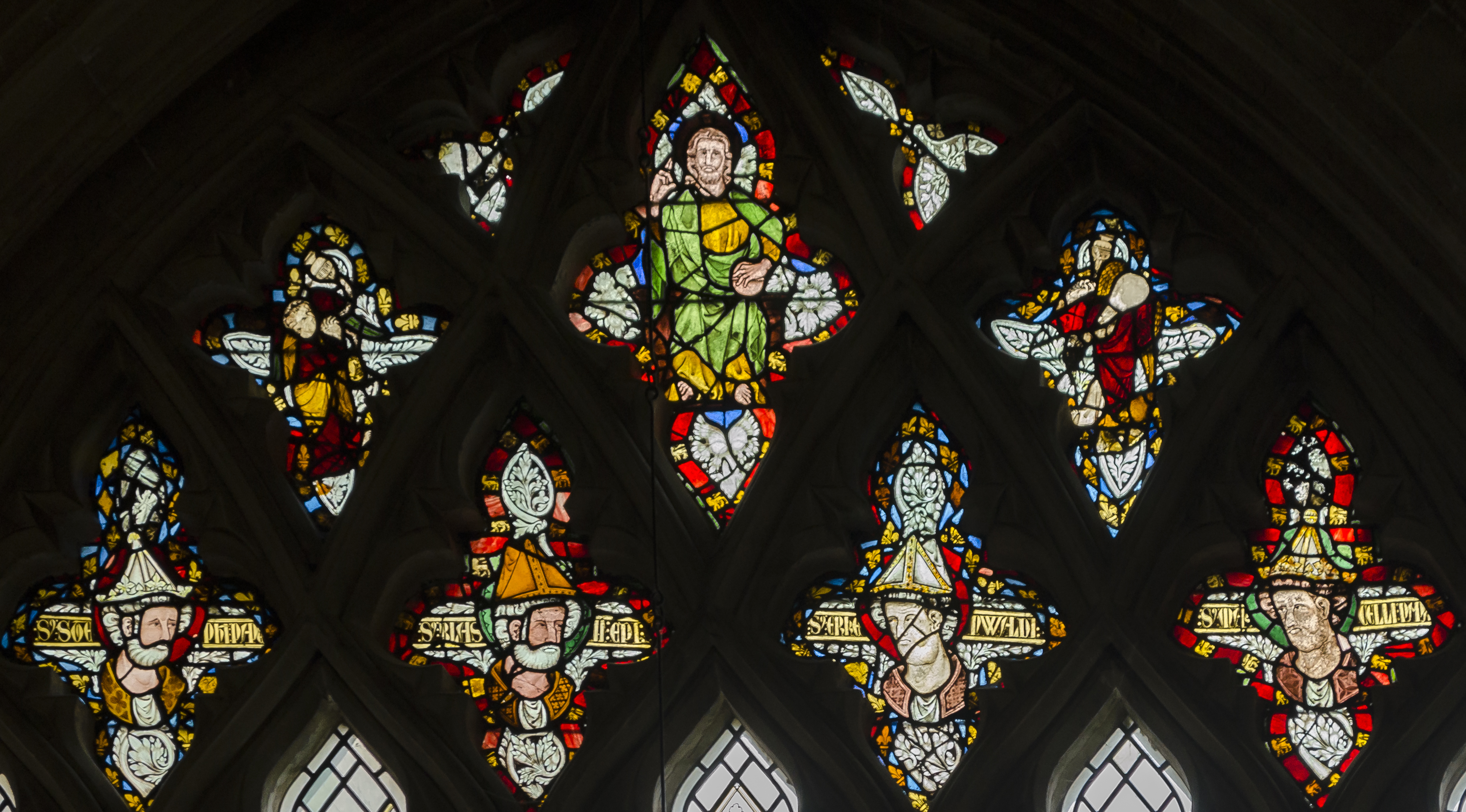
A window at Wells Cathedral; the heads depict Pope Stephen, St Blaise, St Erkenwald, and Pope Marcellus.

The poem is written in alliterative verse.

A typical line divides into two half-lines, each containing two primary beats; the beats are usually the lexical stresses of open-class words. The first three beats—that is, both beats of the first half-line and the first beat of the second half-line—normally alliterate together, while the fourth beat normally does not alliterate with the others. Sometimes the fourth beat may alliterate with the first three beats of the following line, possibly as a point of deliberate construction.

Beat syllables which have no initial consonant and begin with any vowel (syllables with zero onset) alliterate with beat syllables beginning with any other vowel so that, for example, in the line "In Esex was Ser Erkenwolde || an abbay to visite" the "e-" and "a-" sounds alliterate together.

All of these features of the poem's form are conventional for later fourteenth-century alliterative verse.

== Summary ==
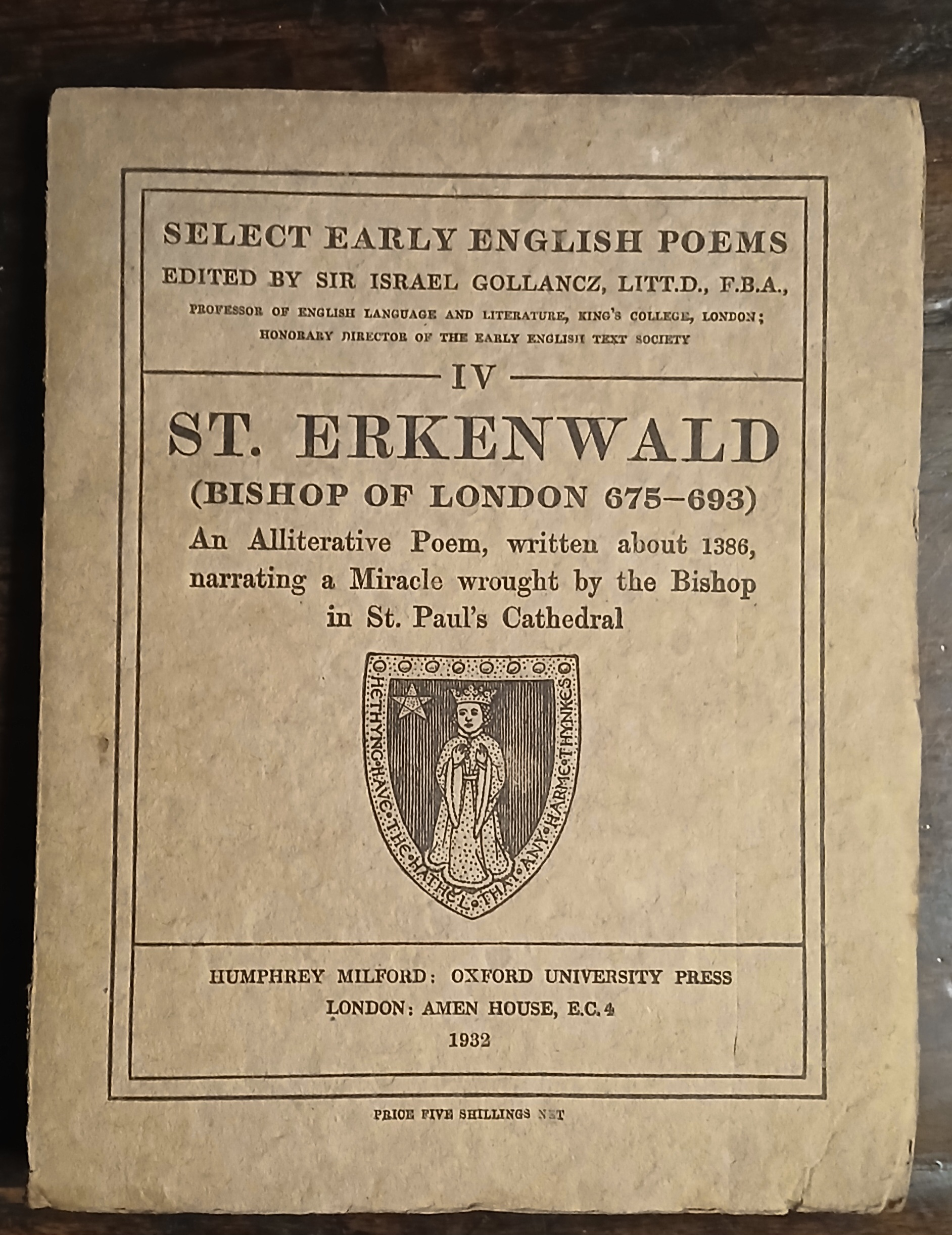
A 1932 copy of the medieval poem 'Erkenwald'

The most important collection of early materials concerning Erkenwald is the Miracula Sanct Erkenwaldi, preserved as a 12th century manuscript in the Matthew Parker collection (Parker 161) at Corpus Christi College, Cambridge. The miracle in the poem is not in these materials, suggesting the story post-dates this manuscript.

It is possible the plot of the poem is a development of an (in its time) well-known story relating to the discovery of the head of a dead judge and John de Beromyarde, a famous Dominican of the later 1300s; a source being Summa Praedicantum.

St Erkenwald's story appears to come in two distinct sections, matching the division made by large initials in the surviving manuscript, noted above. The first provides a brief, historical context for the poem. The first section also depicts the discovery of an awe-inspiring sarcophagus and the concern and confusion of those that found it. The second focuses on St Erkenwald's dialogue with the re-animated corpse.

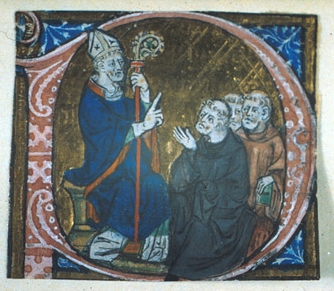
St. Erkenwald instructing monks. A historiated initial from the Chertsey Breviary (Bodley Ms Lat. liturg. d. 42, f. 46rv).

The poem begins with a brief historical description of England's shift from pagan belief to Christendom. The poem says that when, after the passing of the Roman Empire, the pagan Saxons invaded Britain, they drove the British into Wales and established pagan beliefs in the newly created England. St Augustine of Canterbury was sent to convert the English and to purify the pagan temples, replacing them with churches. The poem says that London was then called "New Troy".

The poem proceeds to an incident in the life of St Erkenwald. During the construction of St Paul's Cathedral in London on the site of a former pagan temple, a mysterious tomb is uncovered. Adorned with gargoyles and made of grey marble, the tomb is inscribed with a series of golden characters, but no scholar is able to decipher them.

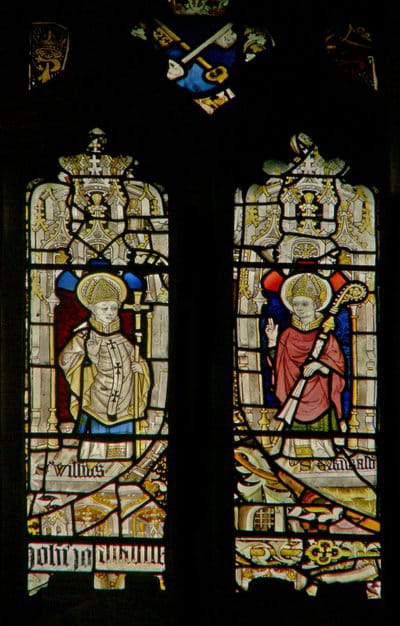
Medieval stained glass window depicting St. Erkenwald and St. William (likely Bishop William of London) in St. Peter Mancroft Church, Norwich

Once granted permission by the sextons, the mayor takes control of the sanctuary and tomb for further investigation. As they open the lid of the tomb, they find a perfectly preserved body and the garments of a king. Since those present are mystified, St Erkenwald is summoned to the tomb.

After Erkenwald prays, hoping to learn the identity of the body, and performs a mass, a "goste-lyfe" animates the corpse, and it begins to reply to his questions. The corpse reveals that he is a pre-Christian Briton, a just judge who lived under the rule of the mythological King Belinus. He was given royal attire in his burial to honour his impartial rulings throughout his time as a judge, and after his death God preserved his clothing and his body on account of his righteousness.

This prompts Erkenwald to ask the judge about the state of his soul. The corpse says that his soul languishes in Limbo. All present weep to hear this, and one of Erkenwald's tears falls on the corpse. Erkenwald promises to prepare water to baptise the corpse, but because he has just invoked the Trinity, his tear accidentally already constitutes baptismal water, and the corpse immediately dissolves into dust, as the soul of the man finally enters heaven.

== Themes ==
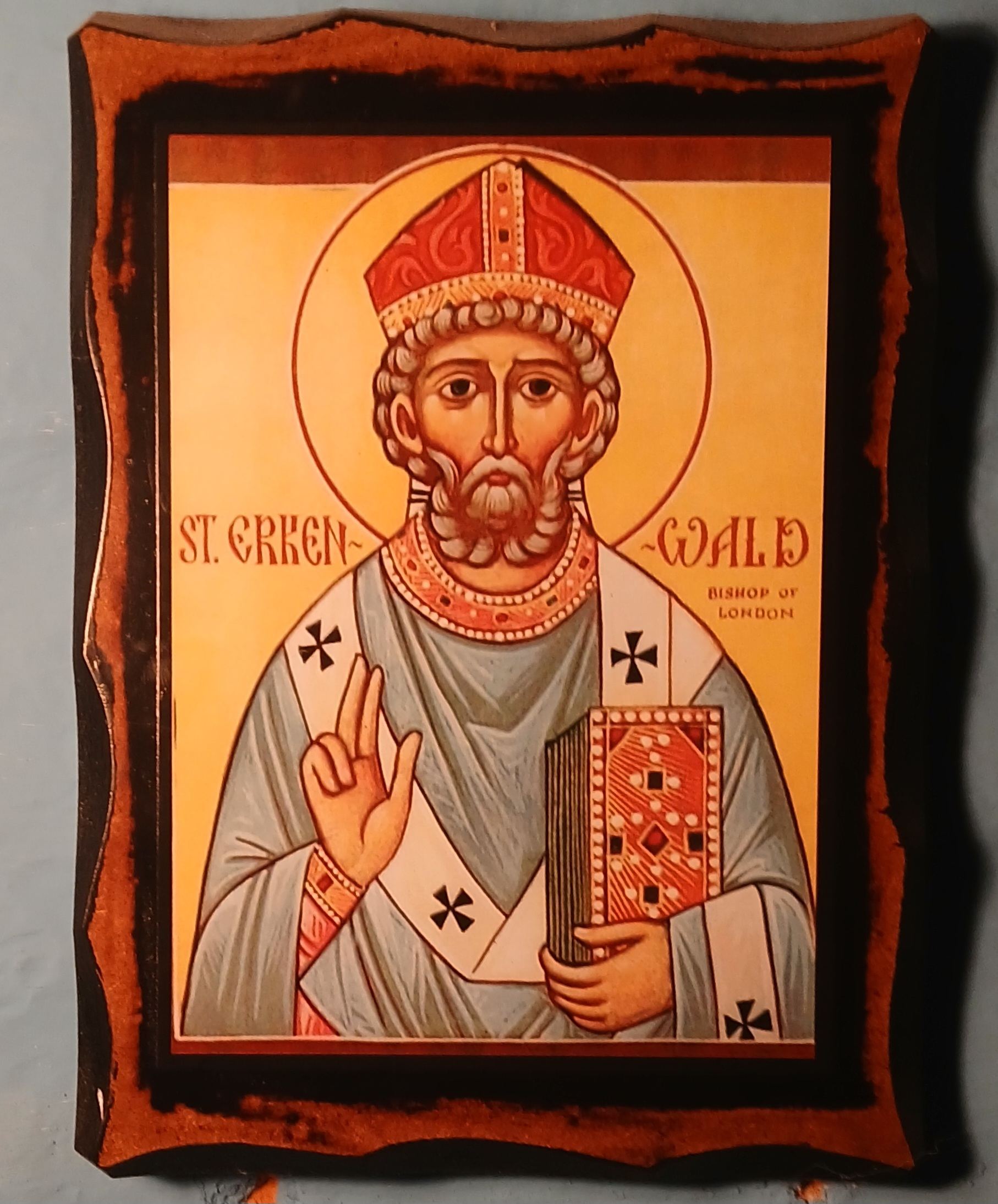
Orthodox image of St Erkenwald, Bishop of London

By presenting an exemplum, this poem addresses, in an accessible and vivid way, the question of whether salvation was possible to persons who lived morally admirable lives without having the opportunity to receive baptism. This was a question which interested and troubled Christians in the period. The story of St Erkenwald suggests that a physical body is necessary for baptism and salvation. It is implied that the judge's body miraculously remained intact only to enable its salvation, since the body dissolved immediately following its baptism. Critics have compared it to the Beowulf poem for reasons allied to this.

The poem is also engaged with fourteenth-century England's sense of its own complicated religious history, as a land which was thought to have been pagan (before the coming of the Romans and for much of the Roman period), Christian (in the late Roman period), pagan (under the earliest English) and then Christian again (after evangelisation by Augustine of Canterbury).

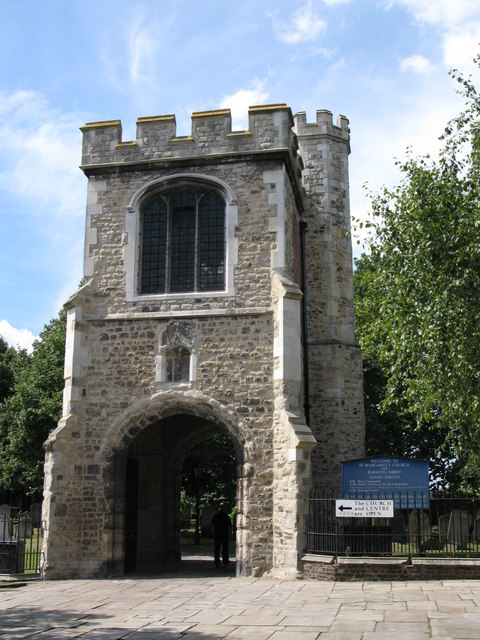
The Curfew Tower of Barking Abbey The Curfew Tower was one of the three gateways to Barking Abbey, founded in 666 by Erkenwald, later Bishop of London.

== Sources ==
There is no direct source for this poem. The known lives of Erkenwald do not contain a miracle concerning the salvation of a pagan judge. The closest analogue is the story of Pope Gregory the Great and the Roman Emperor Trajan. In several versions of the story, Gregory learns of Trajan's just life, and is able to help Trajan's soul enter heaven. This might be the inspiration for St Erkenwald.

The story of Trajan was popular, and can, for example, be found in Langland's Piers Plowman and in an early commentary on Dante's Divine Comedy. In Langland's version of the Trajan story Trajan was saved simply by Gregory's desires and weeping, but in the Dante-commentary tradition the specific sacrament of baptism was necessary; by describing a specific baptism, St Erkenwald aligns itself more closely with this second view on the question of the salvation of righteous pagans.

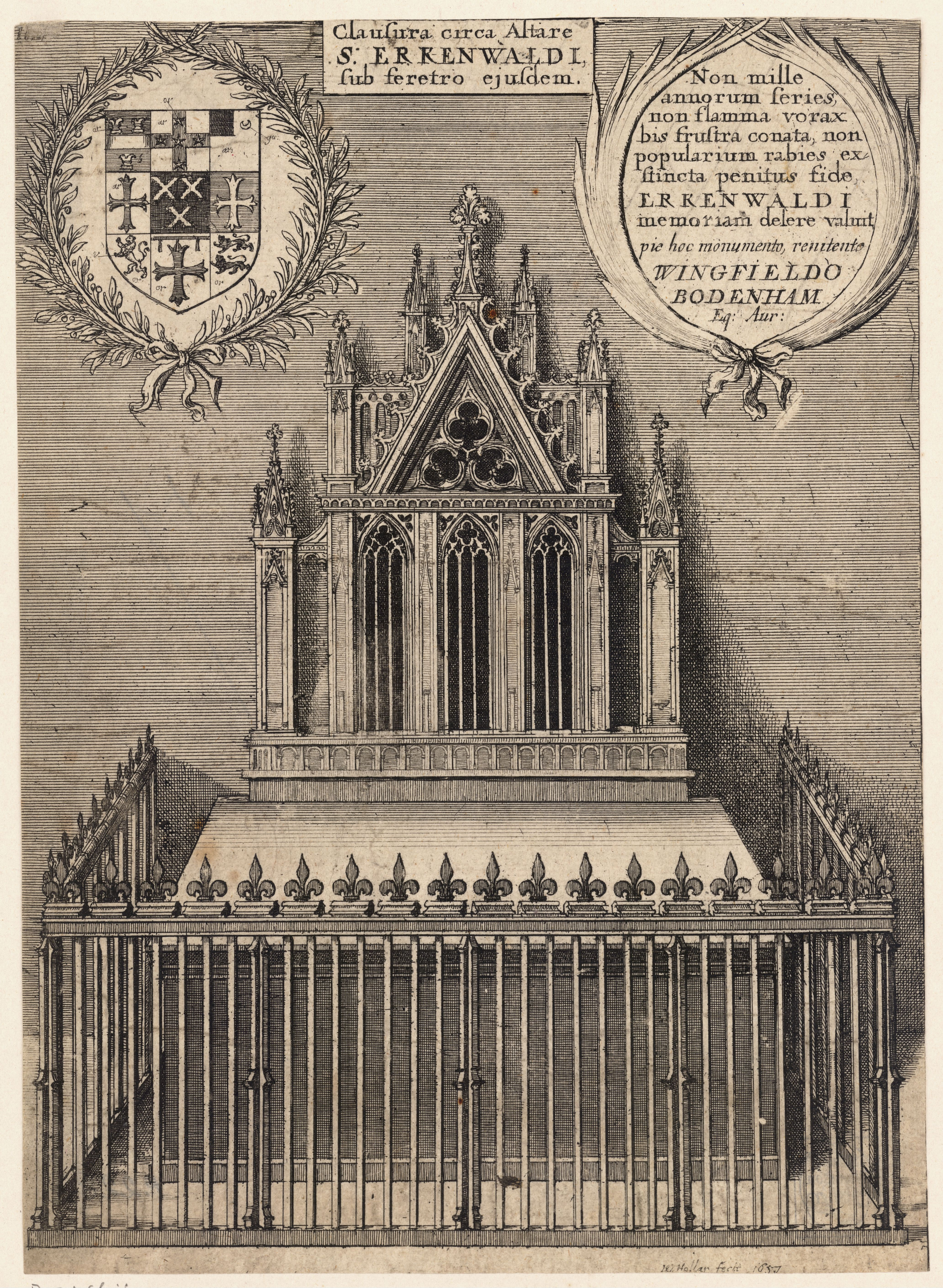
Shrine of St Erkenwald in St Paul's Cathedral, relics removed 1550, lost as a monument in the Great Fire of London

== Language and dialect ==
Past scholarship agrees that the language of the circa 1477 manuscript copy of St Erkenwald can be placed somewhere in the north-west Midlands. The evidence at least strongly suggests that it can be more precisely placed in Cheshire.

However, the language of one late surviving copy—created roughly a century after the poem's composition—cannot be taken as a wholly accurate representation of the poem's original language.

The two obsolete characters within the St Erkenwald excerpt below are the letters yogh (ȝ) and thorn (þ).

=== Example passage ===
Opening lines of St. Erkenwald

At London in Englond noȝt full long [time]
Sythen Crist suffrid on crosse and Cristendome stablyd,
Ther was a byschop in þat burgh, blessyd and sacryd;
Saynt Erkenwolde as I hope þat holy mon hatte.
In his tyme in þat toun þe temple alder-grattyst
Was drawen doun, þat one dole, to dedifie new,
For hit hethen had bene in Hengyst dawes
Þat þe Saxones vnsaȝt haden sende hyder.
Þai bete oute þe Bretons and broȝt hom into Wales
And peruertyd all þe pepul þat in þat place dwelled;
Þen wos this reame renaide mony ronke ȝeres.

— lines 1-11
Translation:

At London in England not very long ago
Since Christ suffered on the cross and established/ founded Christianity,
There was a bishop in that burgh (town), blessed and holy;
Saint Erkenwald, as I believe that holy man was called.
In his time in that town the greatest temple
Was drawn down, that one part of it, to dedicate a new one,
For it had been heathen in Hengest's days
When the Saxons hostilely had come there.
They beat out the Britons and brought them into Wales.
And perverted (led astray) all the people that dwelled in that place;
Then was this realm renegade (i.e. pagan) many rebellious years.

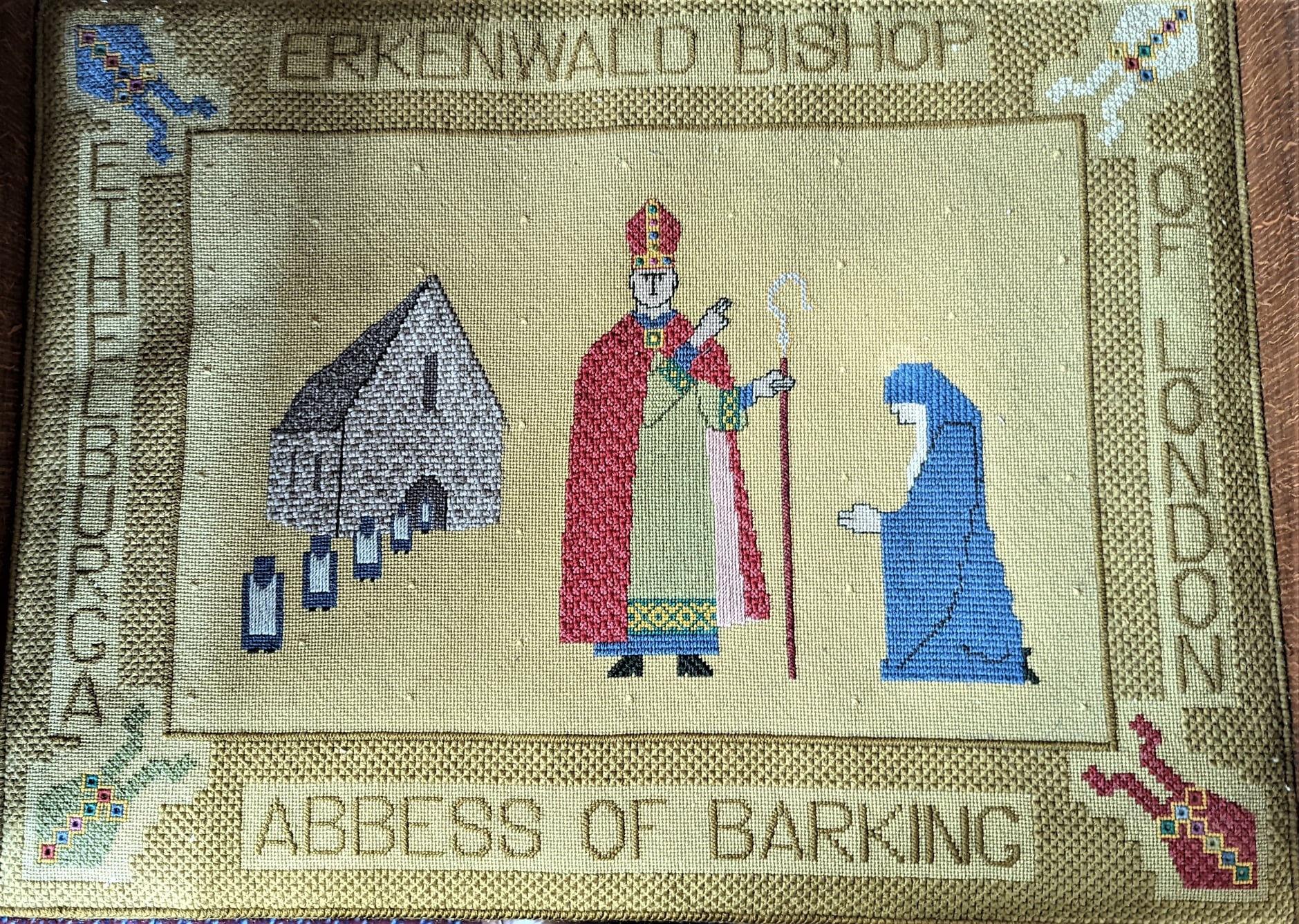
Needlework in Barking Church showng St Erkenwald

== Contemporary engagement with the material ==
The poetry has been engaged with in current culture and scholarship in the several ways, including:

- a 1997 play staged by the Royal Shakespeare Company;
- An episode of the podcast "Pop Medieval"
- 3 May 2023: A sung eucharist at St Paul's Cathedral conducted by the Bishop of London
- in April, 2025 there was a reading of the ancient poem at Soulton Hall by Harry Frost.
