= Holy Trinity Church, Canning Town =

Former church in greater London area

Coordinates: 51°31′6.69″N 0°0′48.63″E

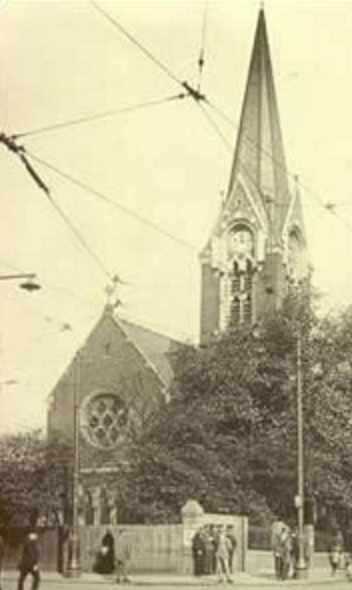
Holy Trinity Church, Canning Town

Holy Trinity Church was a Church of England parish church in Canning Town, east London. Its origins were in the Plaistow and Victoria Docks Mission, set up to serve the growing area of Hallsville by the vicar of St Mary's Church, Plaistow and Antonio Brady. It initially worshipped in the National School on Barking Road until the permanent church opened in 1867, with a parish formed for it the following year by parts of St Mary's and All Saints. Its advowson was initially vested in the bishop, but transferred to the Lord Chancellor in 1886 to allow the benefice of Holy Trinity to be supplemented from revenues from All Hallows Church, London Wall.

The church was badly damaged by bombing in 1941 but re-opened the following year. In 1948 it was closed and later bought by West Ham Borough Council, which demolished it and built flats on the site. A war damage payment to it instead went towards the construction of St Erkenwald's Church, Barking, opened in 1954. The parish survived until 1961, when it was mostly merged into that of St Matthias' Church, Canning Town, whose vicar had administered it in the interim, though some of it passed to St Cedd's Church, Canning Town.
