= Memorial Community Church =

Coordinates: 51.52315°N 0.02386°E

- Memorial Community Church Plaistow
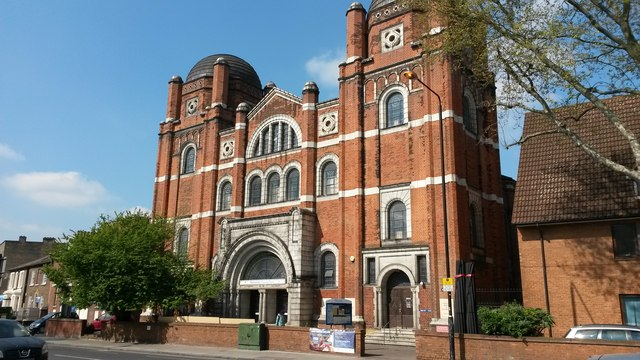
- Memorial Community Church
- Location: 389-395 Barking Road, Plaistow, E13 8AL
- Country: England
- Denomination: Baptist
- Website: https://memorialcc.org.uk/

History
- Founded: 1871

Architecture
- Functional status: Active
- Architect: William Hayne
- Architectural type: Church
- Style: Neo-Byzantine
- Years built: 1921-22
- Construction cost: £60,000

The Memorial Community Church is a Baptist church in Plaistow, Newham, east London. Neo-Byzantine in style, it is grade II listed.

== History ==
The church was originally founded in 1871 as the Barking Road Tabernacle - the preceding building is still extant on Barking Road closer to Canning Town. This was in continuing debt until Robert Rowntree Clifford took over in 1897, reviving and transforming the church membership and clearing all the debts by 1900. Growth led to the formation of West Ham Central Mission in 1904. This ran alongside the church until its present building opened in 1922. Designed by William Hayne, its construction had taken 15 months, costing about £60,000. It was constructed in the Byzantine style with a domed auditorium and two towers, and was dedicated to men from the local community and the congregation who had died in World War I. In 1924 the church received the gift of a new organ from Dame Clara Butt. The organ is of particular interest having been built by R. Spurden-Rutt as their first instrument using electric action. The bells in the East tower were cast by Gillett & Johnston. with the names of 169 local men lost in the First World War cast into them. One bears the name of Prince Maurice of Battenberg, the only member of the British royal family killed in action in the "Great" War, and one is dedicated to the Unknown Warrior. The bells were dedicated in 1926 at a service including a performance by the baritone Kennerley Rumford.

In the New Year Honours of 1938, Robert Rowntree Clifford's wife, Hettie, received the OBE for her efforts as superintendent of the women's work of the Mission.

In 1978, a new trust deed changed the name of the Mission to Memorial Baptist Church Plaistow. The Memorial Community Church was formed in 2006 when the congregation of St Andrew's Church, Plaistow merged into the congregation of Memorial Baptist Church to form one group.
