= Earconwald =

7th-century Bishop of London and saint

Saint Earconwald
- Bishop of London
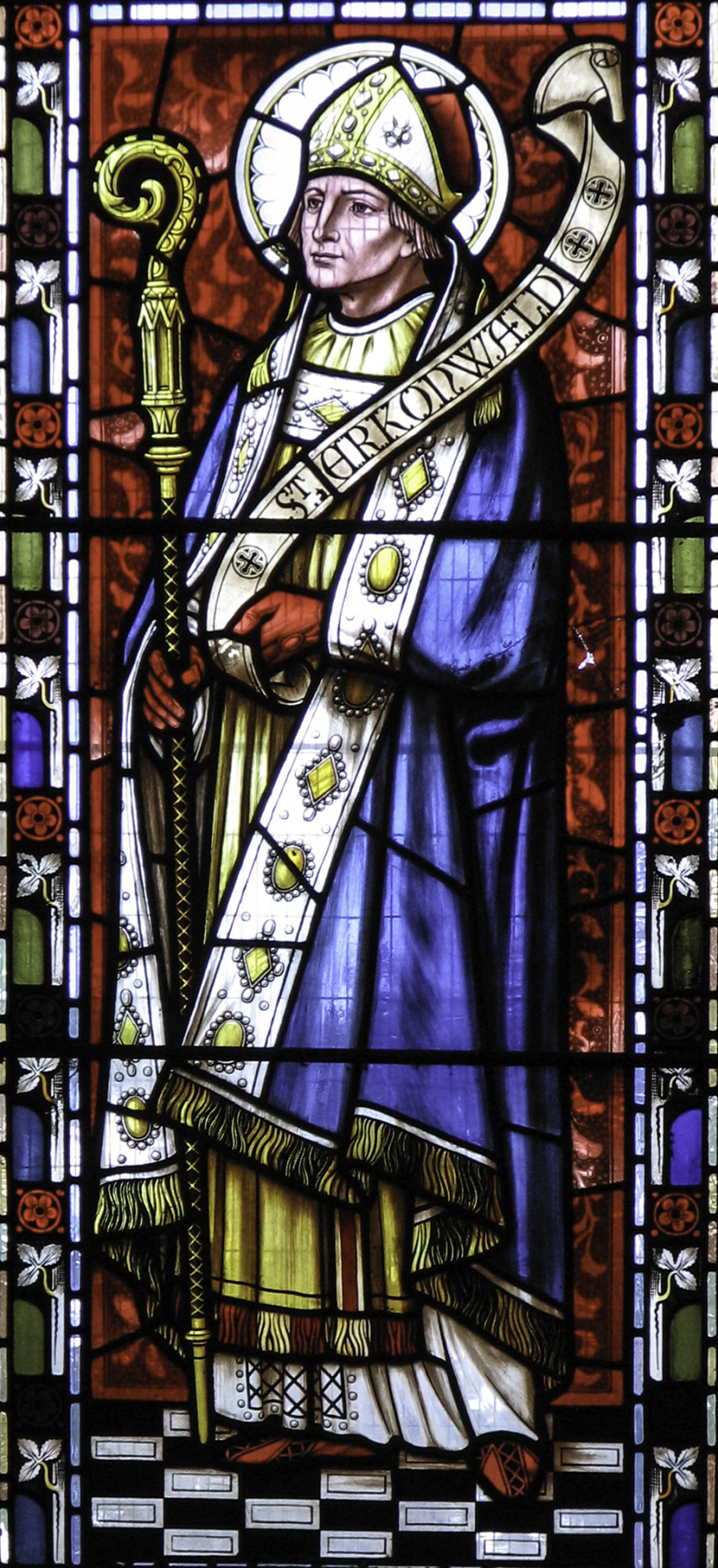
- St Erkenwald window - St Dominic's Church - The Shrine of Our Lady
- Province: Canterbury
- Installed: 675
- Term ended: 693
- Predecessor: Wine
- Successor: Waldhere
- Other posts: Prince, Abbot of Chertsey

Orders
- Consecration: c. 675

Personal details
- Born: c. 630 Kingdom of Lindsey
- Died: 693 Barking Abbey
- Buried: Old St Paul's Cathedral, London though the location and survival of his relics are debated

Sainthood
- Feast day: 13 May; 24 April; 30 April; 14 November in England
- Attributes: bishop in a small chariot, which he used for travelling his diocese; with Saint Ethelburga of Barking
- Patronage: against gout, London
- Shrines: Old St Paul's Cathedral: relics removed by 1550, lost in the Great Fire of London

Erkenwald (also spelled Earconwald (Note: Also Ercenwald, Eorcenwald or Erconwald); died 693) was a Saxon prince who served as Bishop of London from 675 until his death. Operating in fledgling renewal of a diverse borderland diocese that had had bishops in Roman times but had become a pagan territory in the early medieval period, his episcopate was defined by his role as a peacemaker who reconciled competing Roman and Celtic Christian traditions, establishing the current over 1300 year unbroken line of Saxon bishops in the See of London.

He is the eponymous subject of St. Erkenwald, a prominent late-14th-century Middle English alliterative poem frequently attributed to the anonymous Gawain poet. Mirroring the historical bishop’s real-life reputation for cultural synthesis, the narrative centers on a miraculous encounter with the preserved corpse of a pre-Christian judge. Through this setup, the text explores medieval anxieties surrounding the salvation of virtuous pagans, adapting Erkenwald's legacy of historical reconciliation into a profound poetic study of religious tolerance and interfaith dynamics.

He is regarded as the patron saint of London and was called Lundoniae maximum sanctus, 'the most holy figure of London', as well as Lux Londonie, "the light of London". His early memorialisation is linked to London's proto-Renaissance, with Peter Ackroyd saying of him:

"we may still name him as the patron saint of London, [his]... cult survived for over eight hundred years, before entering the temporary darkness of the last four centuries".

He is associated with a very early Anglo-Saxon phase of building at St Paul's Cathedral, with William Dugdale stating he began the building of the cathedral.

The name 'Erkenwald' is a dithematic Germanic name composed of the elements eorcen (meaning "genuine," "pure," or "precious") and weald (meaning "rule" or "power"), together translating to "genuine ruler" or "noble power.

Erkenwald has, in recent times, been portrayed in novels and films, for example in Bernard Cornwell's The Saxon Stories.

The early diocese of London was coterminous with the Kingdom of Essex, making the Bishop of London the Bishop of the East Saxons.

== Life ==
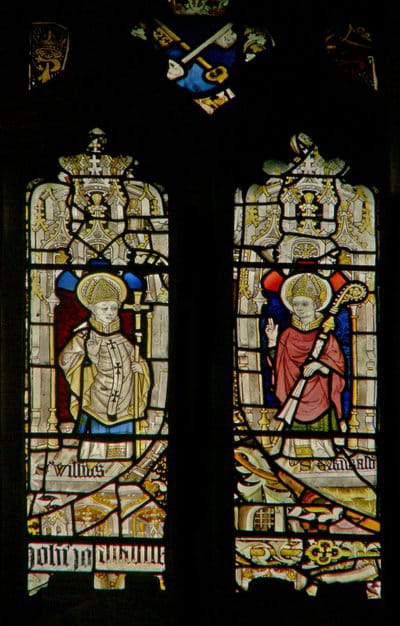
Medieval Stained Glass Window depicting St. Erkenwald and St. William (likely Bishop William of London) in St. Peter Mancroft Church, Norwich.

=== Origins ===
Erkenwald is traditionally of royal ancestry, though there are competing theories as to his precise pedigree, owing to limited records and great the antiquity of his period.

He is often listed as a son of the house of King Offa of Essex (for example by William Dugdale) or King Offa of East Anglia (for example by John of Tynemouth), though the chronology makes these options unlikely. Another tradition identifies him as the son of King Annas, the "holy king of the East-Angles".

The Frankish 'eorcen-' in his name might indicate Kentish descent. He may have been born in the Kingdom of Lindsey in modern Lincolnshire.

As a young man, he may have studied under Mellitus, Archbishop of Canterbury.

=== Career ===
In c. 666, he established two Benedictine abbeys, Chertsey Abbey in Surrey for men, and Barking Abbey for women.

The abbey Erkenwald founded at Chertsey was destroyed, and ninety monks were killed during the Danish wars; it was later refounded by King Edgar and Bishop Ethelwold.

His sister, Æthelburh, was Abbess of Barking. Erkenwald is said to have engaged Hildelith to instruct Æthelburh in the role of abbess. Although sometimes mistaken as the first nunnery in England, it was not; for example, the nunnery at Folkestone was founded earlier in 630 by King Eadbald, with his daughter St. Eanswithe as the first abbess. Furthermore, at the Dissolution, Barking's wealth (£1084 per annum) was surpassed by the nunneries of Sion and Shaftesbury.

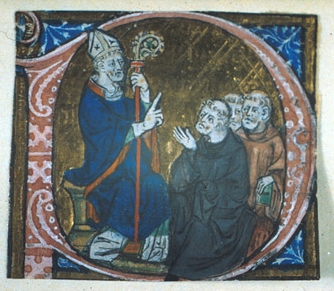
Erkenwald teaching monks in a historiated initial from the Chertsey Breviary (c.1300)

Erkenwald himself served as Abbot of Chertsey. A charter states that in the late 7th century, he and Frithwald gave land in Streatham and Tooting Graveney to Chertsey Abbey; this grant was confirmed in the time of Athelstan in 933.

A legend says that he often preached to the woodmen in the wild forests that lay to the north of London.

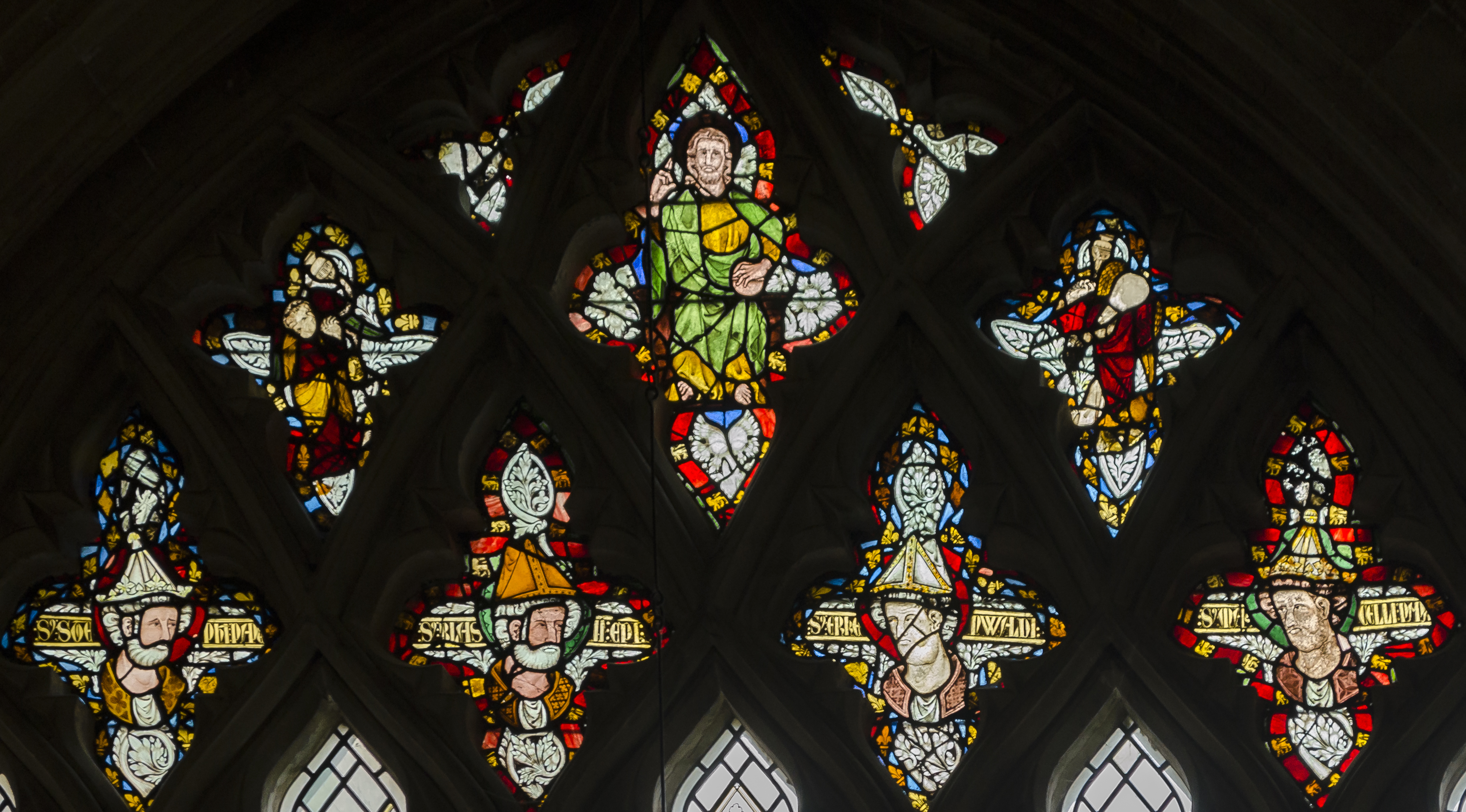
A window in Wells Cathedral. Mostly original glass; the heads depict Pope Stephen, St Blaise, St Erkenwald, and Pope Marcellus.

=== Bishop ===
In 675, Erkenwald became Bishop of London, succeeding Bishop Wine. He was the choice of Archbishop Theodore of Canterbury.

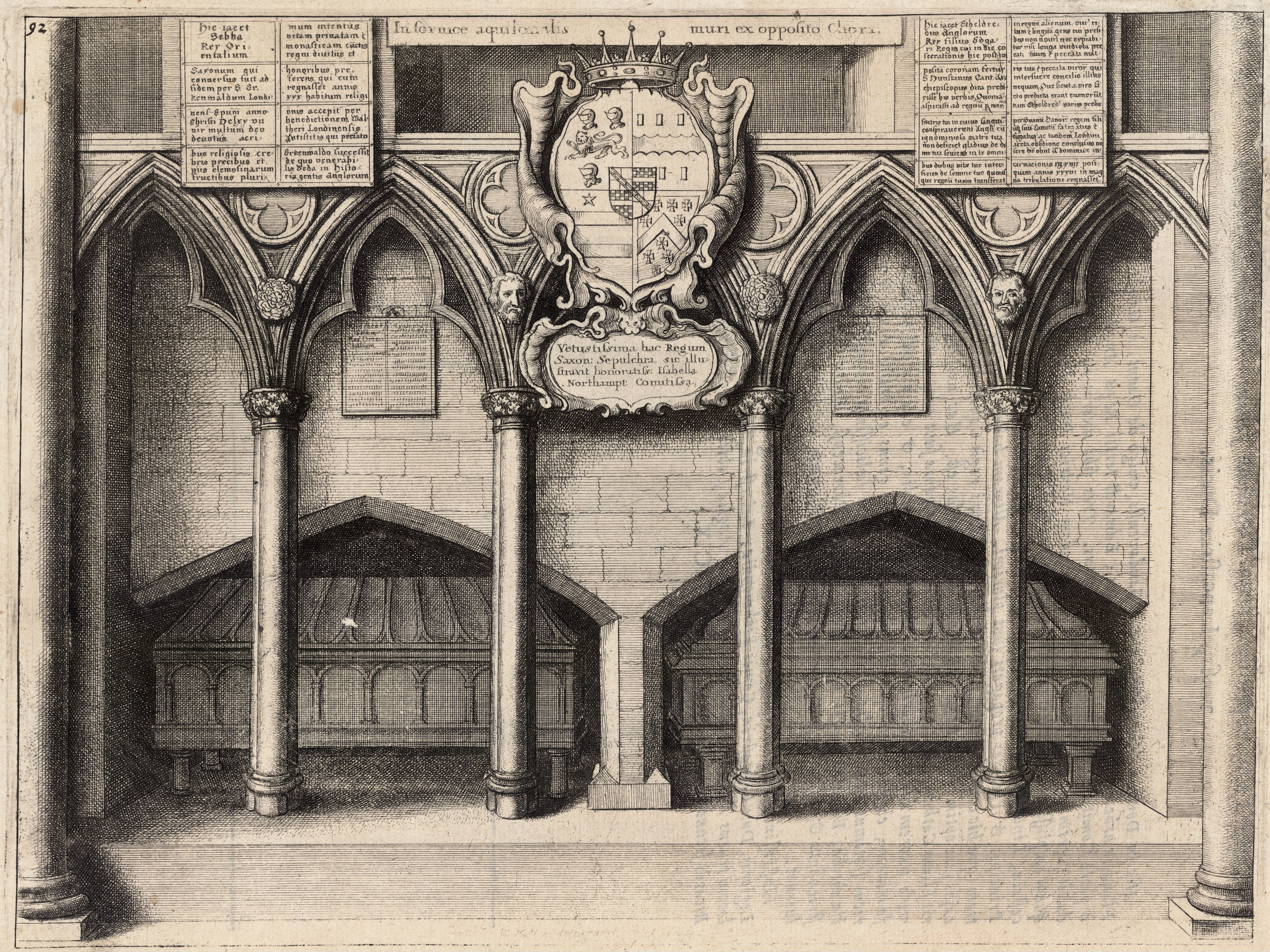
Drawing of tombs of Kings Sæbbi and Æthelred the Unready in Old St Paul's Cathedral by Wenceslaus Hollar. Sæbbi may have been involved in Erkenwald's appointment to the Bishopric of London.

It is also said that his selection as Bishop of London was at the insistence of King Sebbi. An ancient epitaph says that Erkenwald served as bishop of London for eleven years.

He was granted the manor (landholding) of Fulham about the year 691 for himself and his successors as Bishop of London. The manor house was Fulham Palace. Nine centuries later, it was still the summer residence of the Bishops of London.

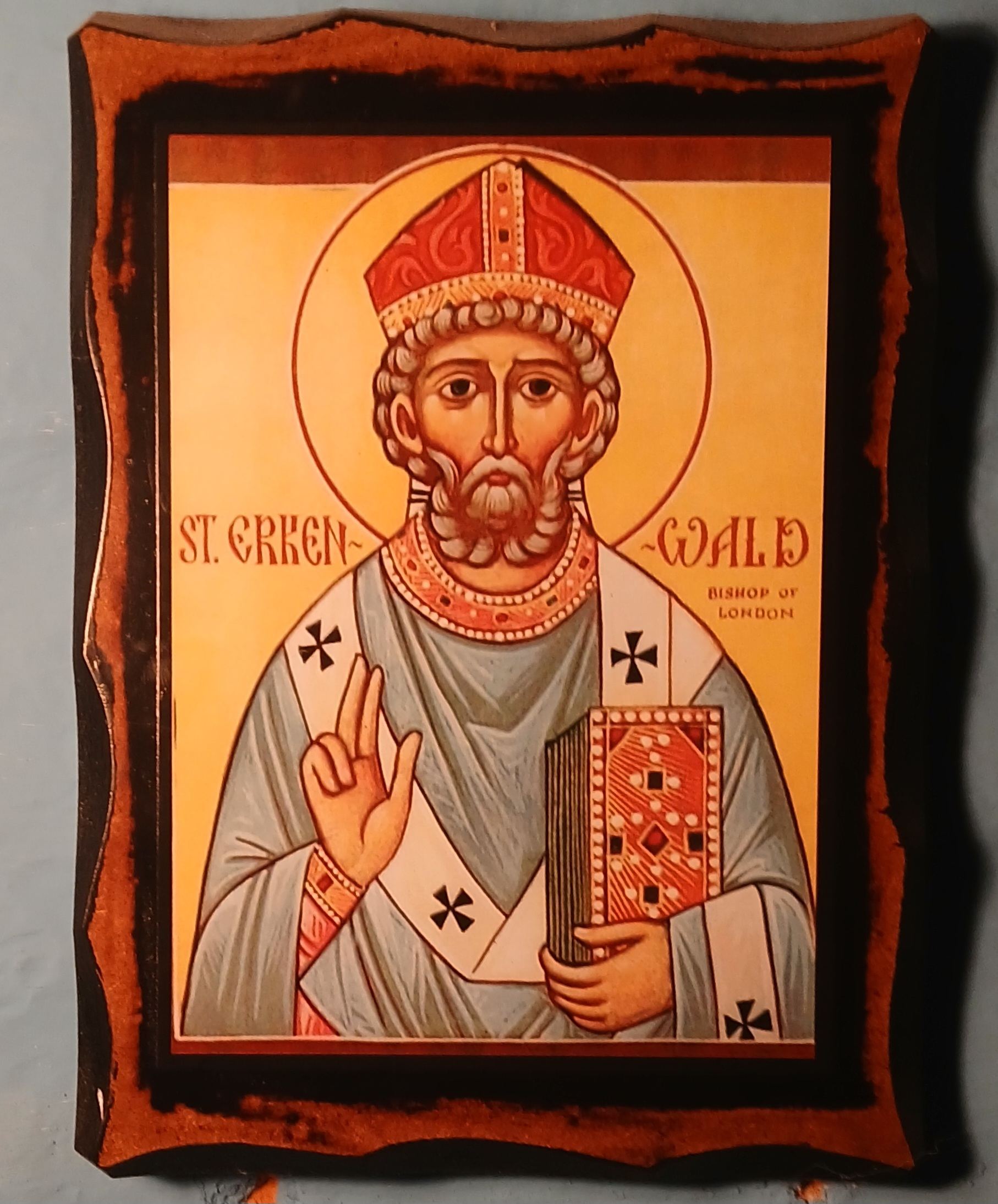
Orthodox Image of St Erkenwald: Erkenwald is considered a saint of the undivided church

Erkenwald was an important contributor to the reconversion of Essex, and the fourth Bishop of London since the restoration of the diocese, and he was present at the reconciliation between Archbishop Theodore and Wilfrith.

While bishop, he contributed to King Ine of Wessex's law code, and is mentioned specifically in the code as a contributor. King Ine named Erkenwald as an advisor on his laws and called Erkenwald "my bishop" in the preface to his laws. This collaboration highlights the profound influence of the Church on Anglo-Saxon legal frameworks. The laws were drafted at a time when there was no central police authority and the legal system was heavily based on wergeld—a system of restitution and compensation where penalties were determined by an individual's social status. The Church sought to mitigate the private feuds and violence that often arose from this system, in part by providing a right to sanctuary or asylum. Erkenwald's direct involvement in shaping these laws demonstrates the Church's active role in establishing a more structured legal order and reducing private warfare.

Erkenwald eleven-year tenure as bishop was primarily focused on reconciliation. His diocese was a diverse community, with a population composed of both native Britons who had remained after the Saxon conquest and the dominant Anglo-Saxon population. The diocese's Christian faith reflected this mix of cultures, having been initially introduced by Roman clergy sent by Pope Gregory I but subsequently established by Celtic monks from Lindisfarne under Cedd. This led to a blended tradition within the see. Erkenwald was instrumental in resolving conflicts within the broader English Church. He helped to reconcile resistance to the reforms introduced by Archbishop Theodore of Canterbury. Notably, Erkenwald played a key role in mediating the long-standing dispute between Wilfrid and Theodore, which was ultimately settled at Erkenwald's residence shortly before Theodore's death. This event cemented Erkenwald's reputation as a peacemaker and a central figure in the unification of the early English Church.

The biographical association of Erkenwald with Pope Gregory the Great may account for the later St. Erkenwald poem's thematic interest and narrative because the saint's existing biographies do not contain a source for the poem’s central miracle—the salvation of a pagan judge. The closest and most significant literary parallel is the widely circulated legend of Pope Gregory and the Emperor Trajan, in which Gregory's intercession delivers the righteous pagan Trajan's soul. The poem adapts this popular analogue to make a precise theological argument. While some versions of the Gregory/Trajan story suggested Gregory's desires alone secured Trajan's salvation, the St. Erkenwald poem insists on the judge receiving a miraculous baptism. By requiring this sacrament, the poem aligns itself with the more rigid theological tradition (found in commentaries on Dante) that maintained baptism was necessary for the salvation of even the most virtuous pagans. This link to Gregory's miracle thus provides the narrative template and the framework for the poem's sophisticated theological commentary.

Current historical scholarship credits Erkenwald with a major role in the evolution of Anglo-Saxon charters, and it is possible that he drafted the charter of Caedwalla to Farnham.

The historical misattribution of Fursey's burial to Erkenwald is a common point of confusion. The error arises from the similarity of their names, as two distinct historical figures have been conflated. The individual responsible for receiving Fursey's body and having it buried in a basilica in Péronne was Erchinoald, a powerful Frankish nobleman and mayor of the palace. Erchinoald was a contemporary of Fursey and played a key role in the establishment of Péronne as a significant pilgrimage site for Irish monks. In contrast, Erkenwald, lived in a later period in the 7th century, and credit for the events surrounding Fursey's burial belongs to Erchinoald. This distinction is essential for an accurate historical account.

=== Building works ===
Bishopsgate, one of the eastern gates on London's largely lost Roman and medieval city wall, was said to have been repaired by Erkenwald, and to have taken its name from him.

Erkenwald is said to have spent a good deal on the early building of St Paul's, and in later times he almost occupied the place of a traditionary founder; the veneration paid to him was second only to that which was rendered to St Paul.

=== Death and legacy ===
Erkenwald died in 693 while on a visit to Barking Abbey. His remains were buried at a pilgrimage shrine in Old St Paul's Cathedral. The Vita of St Erkenwald recounts that as he died, an extraordinary fragrance filled his cell, as though the whole building had been drenched in the sweetest perfume.

For a period immediately after the Norman Conquest, Erkenwald was marginalised in religious practice. The Normans replaced most of the English ecclesiastical office holders, either immediately, or upon their death with the appointment of a Norman cleric as successor.

The most important collection of early materials concerning Erkenwald is the Miracula Sancti Erkenwaldi, preserved as a 12th-century manuscript in the Matthew Parker collection (Parker 161) at Corpus Christi College, Cambridge. The miracle in the poem is not in these materials, suggesting that the story post-dates this manuscript.

In art, Erkenwald is often depicted as a bishop riding in a small "chariot," which was a type of wheeled chair similar to a bath chair used during the Saxon era. He used this for transport due to his severe gout. Sometimes, a woman is shown touching the chair, which may be a representation of the healing miracles associated with him. He is also occasionally portrayed alongside Ethelburga of Barking, his sister and the abbess of Barking Abbey.

== Relics and shrine ==
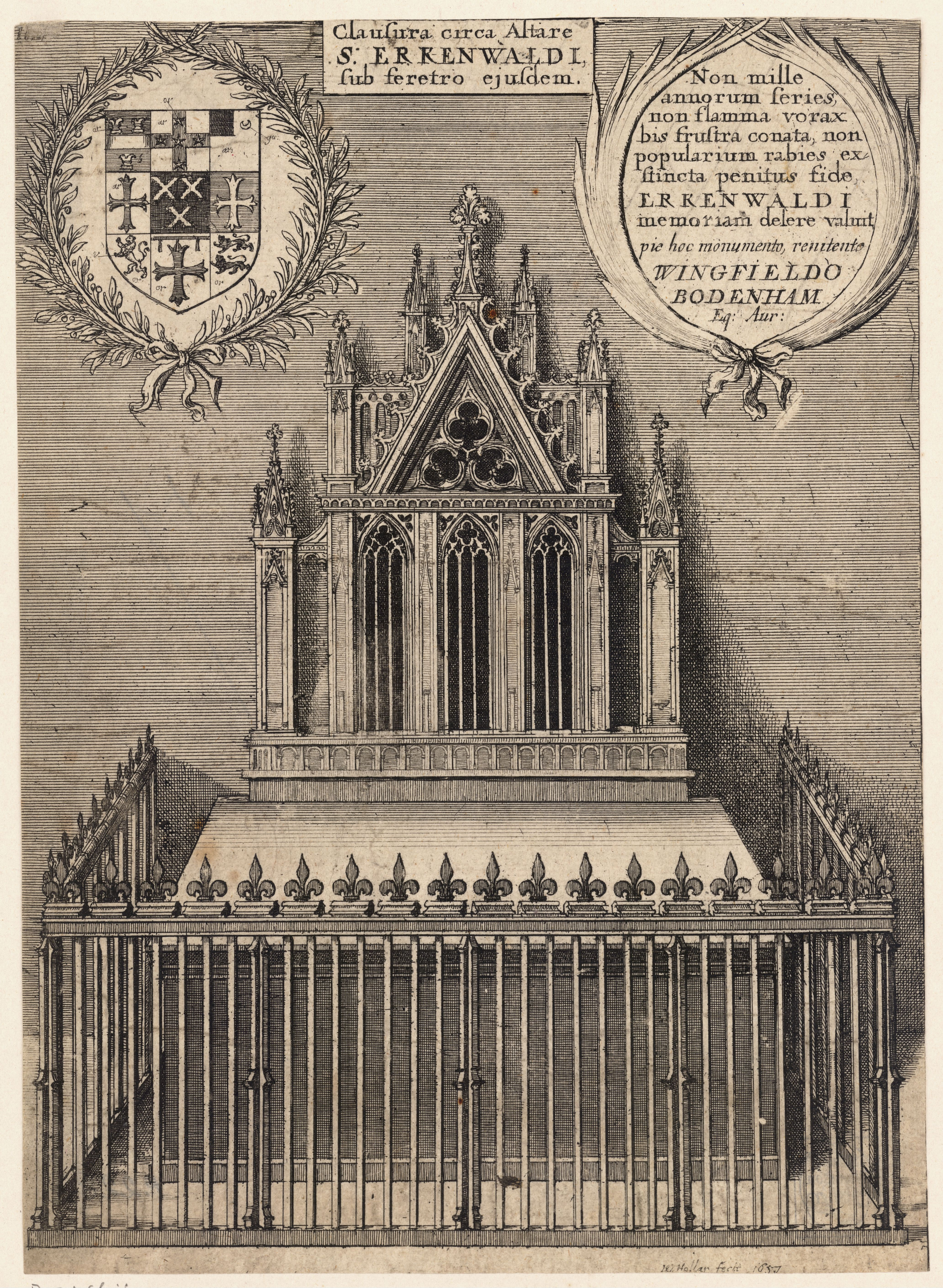
Shrine of St Erkenwald, relics removed 1550, lost as a monument in the Great Fire of London; engraving by Wenceslas Hollar (d. 1677)

Margaret MacLean writes that the Old St Paul's Cathedral's "greatest glory was the Shrine of St Erkenwald". The shrine has drawn comparison to that of Edward the Confessor at Westminster Abbey.

It is said that on the death of St Erkenwald, there was a struggle between the canons of St Paul's and the monks of Chertsey as to who should bury him, during which the people of London brought his body to St Paul's. The people of London, bringing the body to the city, are supposed to have said:

"We are like strong and vigorous men who will... undermine and overturn cities heavily fortified with men and weapons before we give up the servant of God, our protector... we ourselves intend that such a glorious city and congregation shall be strengthened and honoured by such a patron."

During the chase, a severe storm broke out, and the group was blocked from crossing the River Roding when the waters surged. However, a devout man among the Londoners called for everyone to stop and pray, asking God to decide who should bury the saint. The storm then instantly passed, candles around the body spontaneously relit, and the river's waters parted, allowing them to continue to London.

On the journey to London with the body, the River Lea is said to have parted to make way for the dead saint. This local mania for miracles and relics is considered the first evidence that Saxon Londoners were becoming properly enthusiastic about Christianity.

In the great fire in 1087 it is said that the shrine was untouched. the relics were put in a silver shrine. This shrine was put in a new, vast crypt, specially built to hold the "valuable remains of St. Erkenwald" in the wider new building which was built to replace the lost St Paul's by Bishop Maurice. The bishop’s body had been buried in the crypt, and the vault above the tomb was decorated with paintings.

The body was transferred to a shrine in the cathedral in 1140. On November 14, 1148, the body was translated to a position near the high altar, close to the shrine of St. Mellitus, with the shrines of the two saints likely standing side by side on the altar beam. In 1314, Bishop Gilbert de Segrave laid the first stone of a new shrine to which the relics of Erkenwald were translated twelve years later. This was a fixed structure on which the feretory was placed, and it was the commencement of the shrine that would stand until the Reformation. The relics were sealed in a leaden casket fashioned in the form of "a gabled house or church". An inventory from 1245 describes the feretory as being of wood, covered with silver plates, and enriched with 130 precious stones. By the time his relics were placed behind the high altar of St Paul's they were supposed to have been with the couch in which he was carried in his declining years, fragments of which were associated with miracles. In the time of Bede, it was recorded that miracles were effected by this couch.

It is recorded that the servants of the church could only move the relics of St Erkenwald "clandestinely at night" because to do otherwise would have created hysteria among the crowds. The burials of both Erkenwald and Sebbi quickly became the focus of saints’ cults and pilgrimages. This local mania for miracles and relics has been described as the first evidence that Londoners were becoming enthusiastic about Christianity and that newly returned religion had found its footing in the area. Erkenwald's grave was a popular place of pilgrimage up to the Reformation.

The shrine was constantly enriched by canons and by the merchants of London, well into the 15th century, and miracles were reported at the site of the shrine into the 16th century. The citizens of London took special pride in the magnificent shrine, and had a special devotion to St Erkenwald. The reported increase in miracles made the shrine one of the most popular resorts for pilgrims. The end of the fourteenth century saw riches pouring into the coffers of the humble Saxon bishop. Offerings included twelve nobles from King John of France and a sapphire from Richard de Preston, a grocer, which was intended for the cure of eye infirmities and whose virtues were publicly proclaimed.

Amongst the Ashmole manuscripts in the Bodleian Library is the following entry in Elias Ashmole's own hand that concerns work on the shrine in 1448:

"Pondus Cancelli ferrei ante Altare Sancti Erkenwaldi facti Ao Dni. 1448 per manus Stephani Clampard, fabri, sumptibus Decani et Capituli elevati ibidem vi. die Junii anno predicto, 3438 lb. precii cujuslibet lb. cum ferra 4d. Summa 641. 2s.

Expens. in ferro 3438 lb. precio cujuslibet vs. Summa 8 li. 16 s. 8 d.

Item in vasos ferri ixc precio ut supra. Summa xlv s.

Item in Stannum ad dealban. Summa viij. li.

(The weight of the iron chancel in front of the Altar of St. Erkenwald made AD 1448 by the hands of Stephen Clampard, carpenter, at the expense of the Dean and Chapter raised there on 6 June of the aforesaid year, 3438 lb. the price of each lb. with iron 4d. Total 641. 2s.

Expense. in iron 3438 lb. price of each vs. Total £8 16s. 8d.

Also in vessels of iron at the same price as above. Total 45 shillings.

Also for tin for whitewash. The sum of £8

Ackroyd notes that:

"successful lawyers of London…on nomination as serjeants of law, would walk in procession to St Paul’s in order to venerate the physical presence of the saint."

When Catherine of Aragon made her entry into London, two days before her marriage to Prince Arthur, heir to the throne, she visited St Paul's and made an offering there at the shrine of St Erkenwald. The couple were married on St Erkenwald's Day, with the date likely selected to be in alignment with the saint's day.

The St Paul's shrine had the relics removed during the Reformation; the empty shrine survived until the Great Fire of London.

In late 1549, at the height of the iconoclasm of the Reformation, Sir Rowland Hill altered the route of his Lord Mayor's day procession and said a de profundis at the tomb of either Erkenwald or Bishop William. There are differing accounts of what happened to his relics, with suggestions the relics were plundered or incinerated, or that he was reburied in St Paul's Cathedral at the east end of the choir, or that they might have been "hidden to be recovered later".

One commentary on the location of his relics summarises the understanding of this point as follows:

"his relics were either destroyed or hidden in a secure place by the faithful from the bloodthirsty iconoclasts. There is a modern speculation that the relics... may still rest at the east end of the present Cathedral choir next to the east altar. Perhaps one day... will reveal the fate of this holy man’s bodily remains."

One commentator has observed that "destruction of this major shrine, located behind the high altar, severed the last connection between St Paul’s and its Saxon predecessor ... (the precise whereabouts have yet to be discovered)."

After the Great Fire of London, Christopher Wren made archaeological investigations into the ruins to St Paul's Cathedral looking for the Saxon building Erkenwald had had built. No specific archaeological evidence of Erkenwald's relics has ever been discovered during these extensive digs, forcing scholars to rely on documentary and artistic records and oral traditions which have conflicting senses of what happened.

=== Potential survival of Erkenwald's relics and the St Paul's altar stone ===
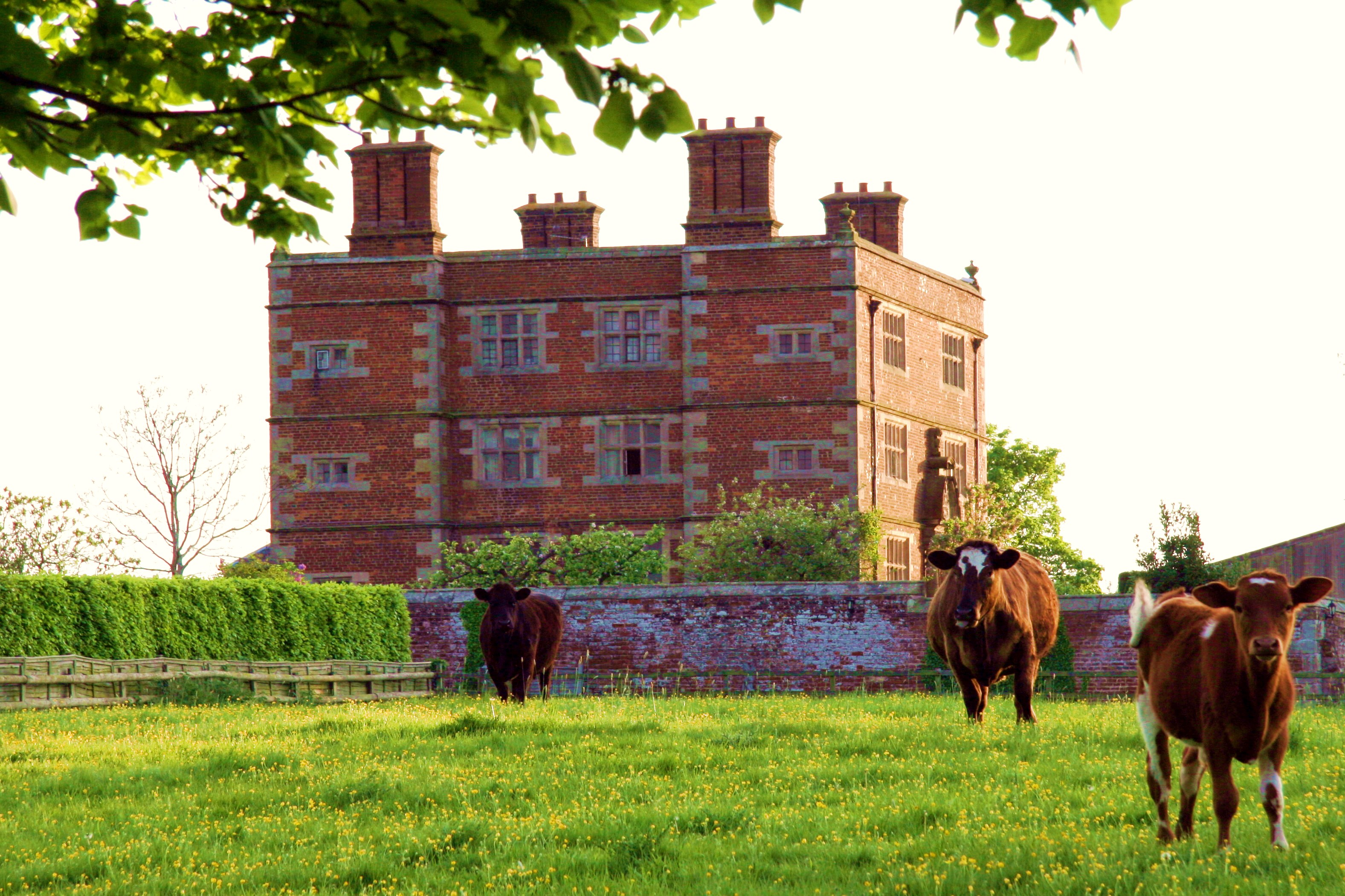
Soulton Hall, which once had a pyramidal roof, is considered to have been modeled on the shrine of Erkenwald

The realization that St. Erkenwald's relics were missing from London following later investigations (such as those by Christopher Wren) has led to speculation that they were rescued from destruction, lately there has been public discussion of the thesis they were taken Shropshire, by Sir Rowland Hill, linking a site in the garden of Soulton Hall with the saint's memory due to its acquisition. Hill who held the office of Sheriff of the City of London when Erkenwald's shrine was disturbed and Lord Mayor when St Paul's Cathedral's high altar stone was pulled down.

These questions have been addressed in written questions in the House of Commons.

There is now a temporary monument over the site associated with the possible translation.

There is also a pattern of interdenominational religious observance in the prayer room at Soulton Hall.

The thesis that Sir Rowland Hill took the relics of Erkenwald to Soulton was the focus of a special episode of the podcast The Rest Is History with Tom Holland in August 2026 where the building being a model of the lost shrine was explored.

This matter was brought to Shropshire Council in a motion in full council in September 2026.

== The poem of St Erkenwald ==
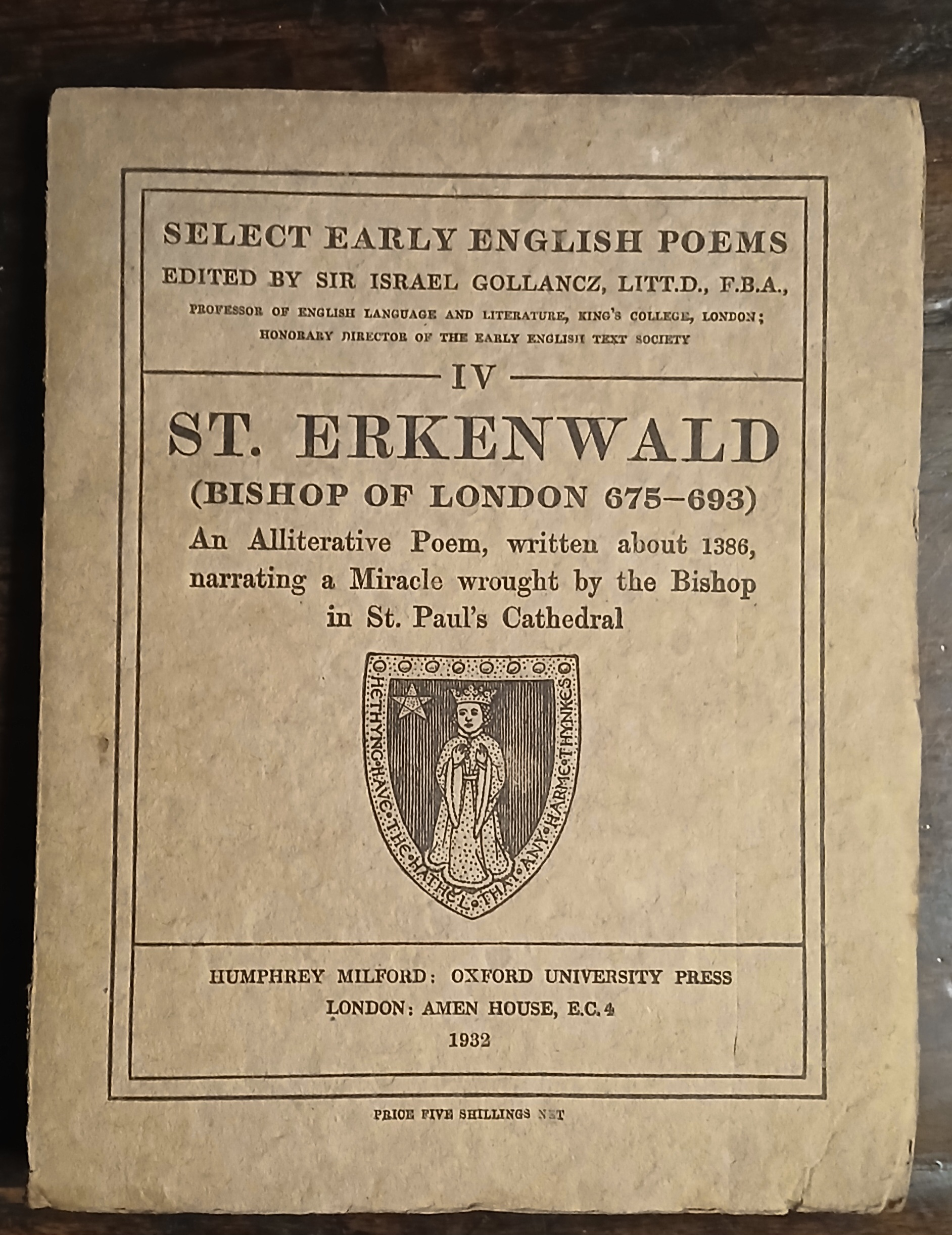
A 1932 copy of the medieval poem 'Erkenwald'

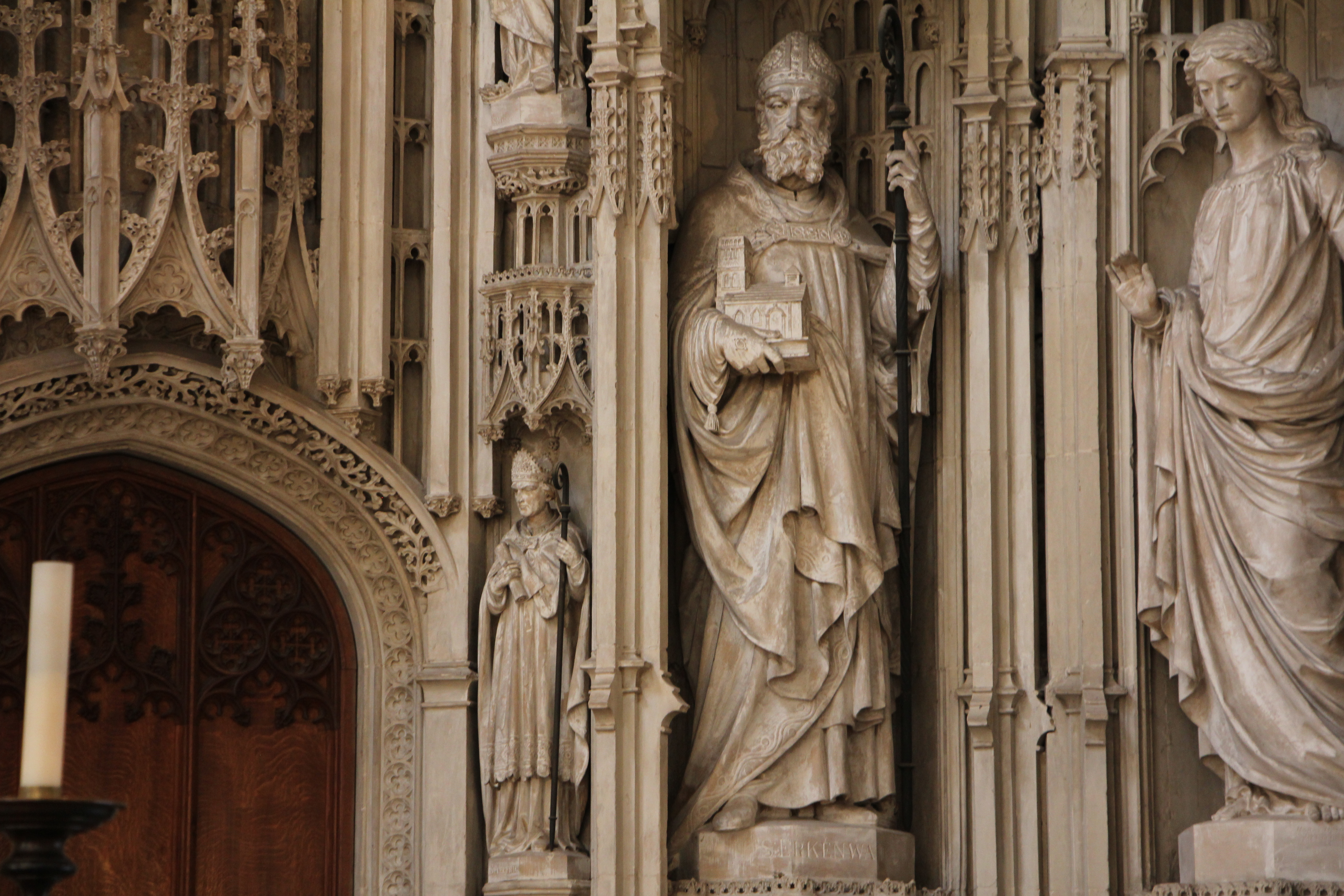
Statue of Erkenwald at St Albans Cathedral

Erkenwald was the subject of the alliterative St Erkenwald Poem, written in the 14th century by a poet from the Cheshire/Shropshire/Staffordshire area.

The text is thought to be the work of the Pearl Poet whose identity is debated and uncertain.

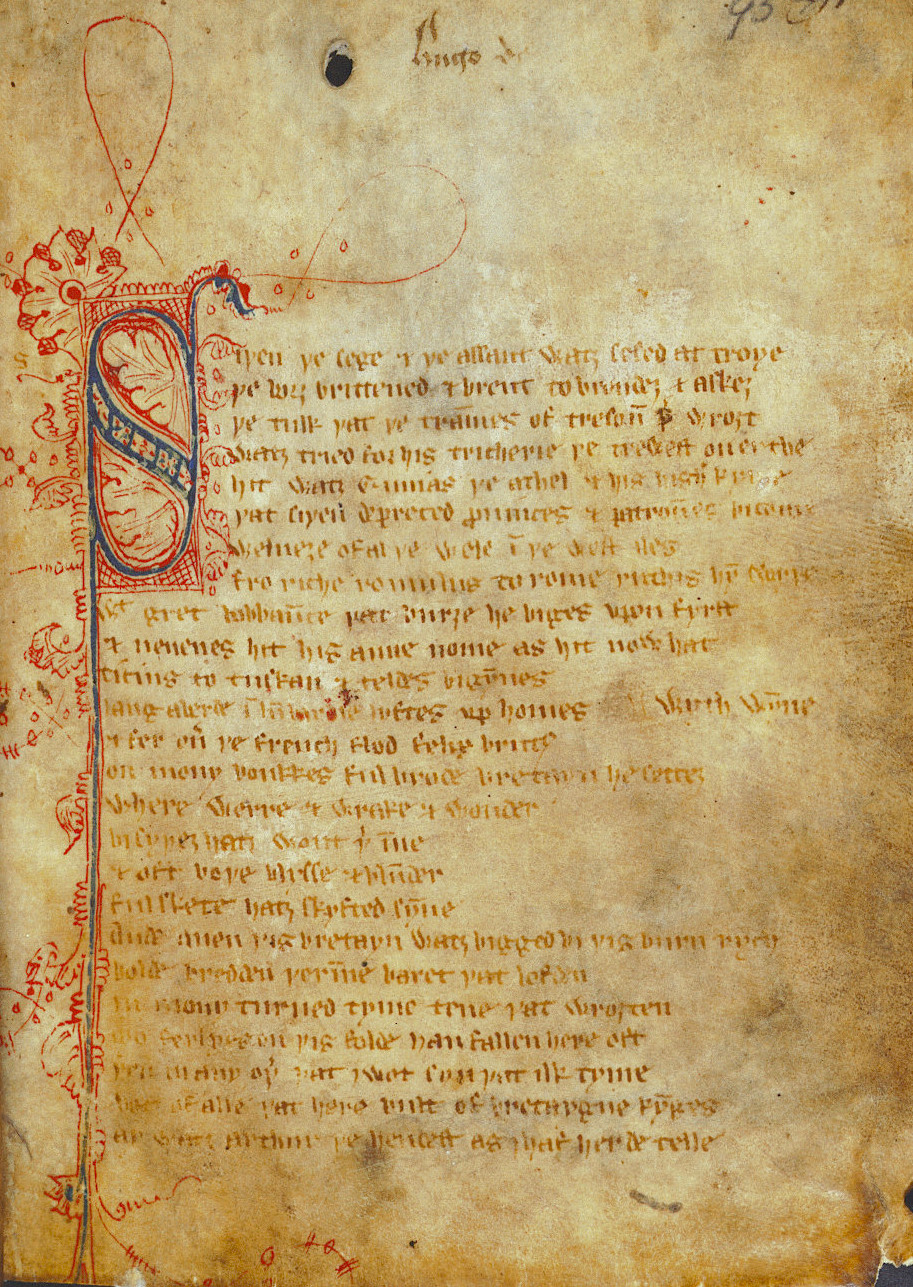
Manuscript text in Sir Gawain and the Green Knight

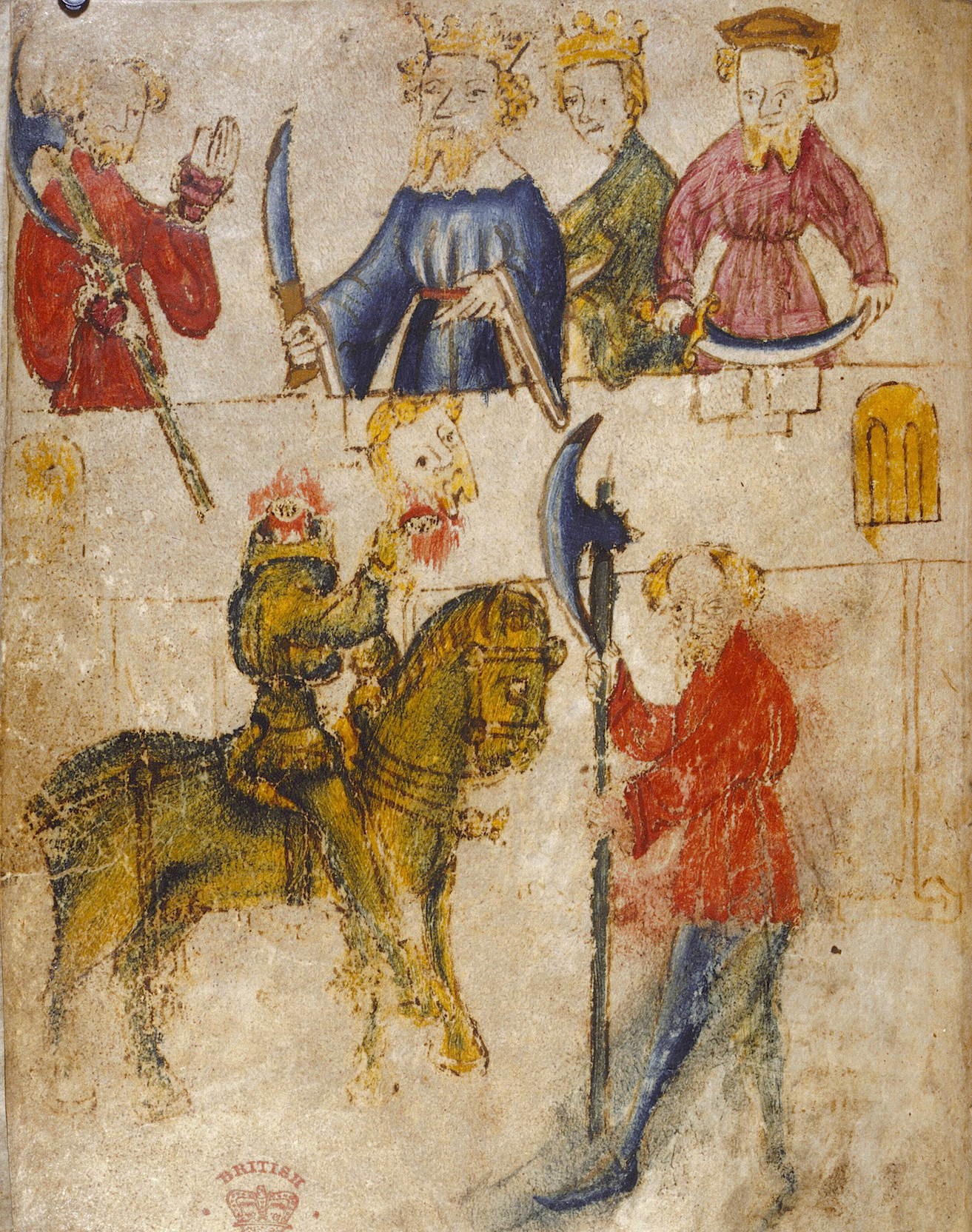
An illustration in the oldest copy of the same poem

The text and an illustration from the only surviving manuscript of that work: St Erkenwald may have provided inspiration for the same writer as for this text

The poem is significant in the way it deals with the spiritual welfare of people who could not hear the Christian message, and critics have compared it to the Beowulf poem in this regard. The poem has survived in only one manuscript, British Library MS Harley 2250.

The document was discovered in 1757 by Thomas Percy; the manuscript had been in the possession of Sir Humphrey Pitt of Balcony House, Shifnal, and Priorslee, Shropshire.

Other important ancient literary materials narrowly avoided being burnt as kindling by household staff in the circumstances in which Percy was discovering this important cultural survival.

The poem has been linked thematically and in plot terms with the Legend of Trajan and the Miracle of St Gregory; that legend itself being referred to in the Divine Comedy by Dante (Purgatorio (x. 73-75) and Paradiso (xx 106-117)).

Another possible inspiration for the plot in the poem is found in Kaiserchronik, the Middle High German history of Roman and German emperors dating to around 1150.

Some familiarity with the story is also contended for St Thomas Aquinas.

Within pictorial art, the Berne tapestry (copied from paintings by Roger van der Wayden of the Brussels Town Hall in the mid-1400s, which were lost in the conflicts of the 1600s) and apparently repeated in the Cologne Town Hall in the High Medieval period, provides a visual expression of the themes.

The intention of this art was to remind judges to dispense impartial justice.

== Feast day and translation day ==
His feast day is 30 April, with successive translations (see below) being celebrated on 1 February, 13 May and 14 November (date of translation to the site of the last shrine in St Paul's Cathedral). He is a patron saint of London.

Prior to the Reformation, the anniversaries of his death as well as his translation were observed at St Paul's as feasts of the first class, by an ordinance of Bishop Braybroke in 1386.

The following Antiphon and Collect for the Feast of St Erkenwald is recorded:

Latin	English Translation
De Sancto Erkenwaldo Episcopo. Antipho: O decus insigne, nostrum pastorumque benigne, O lux Londonie, pater Erkenwalde beate, Quem super astra Deum gaudes spectare per eum, Aspice letantes tua gaudia nos celebrantes, Et tecum vite fac participes sine fine. V. Ora pro nobis beate Erkenwalde. R. Ut digni efficiamur. "Oratio. Omnipotens sempiterne Deus, apud quem est continua semper Sanctorum festivitas Tuorum, presta, quesumus, ut qui memoriam beati Erkenwaldi pontificis agimus, ab hostium nostrorum eruamur nequitia: et ad eternorum nos provehi concedas premiorum beneficia. Per. Pater noster. Ave Ma	Concerning Saint Erkenwald the Bishop. Antiphon: O distinguished God, our kind shepherd, O light of London, blessed father Erkenwald, Whom above the stars you rejoice to behold God through him, Look upon us celebrating your joys, and live with you without end. V. Pray for us blessed Erkenwald. R. That we may become worthy. Prayer. Almighty and everlasting God, with whom is the continual festival of Thy Saints, grant, we beseech, that we who commemorate the blessed high priest Erkenwald, may be delivered from the wickedness of our enemies: and grant us to advance to the eternal blessings of the first. Through Jesus Christ. Our Father. Ave Maria

So far back as 1431, the Masters of the Lincoln's Inn Bench restricted the number of annual revels to four: the feast of St Erkenwald, alongside the feast of the Purification of our Lady; Midsummer and Halloween.

There were other examples of statecraft being associated with St Erkenwald in the Tudor period: in 1522, there was a state visit to London by Charles V, Holy Roman Emperor, hosted by Henry VIII. The entertainments included a pageant near Cheapside, where Charlemagne greeted the two heads of state and gave them gifts; Erkenwald was incorporated into the performance, with St Dunstan, Thomas Becket, John the Baptist, John of Gaunt all also featured.

Henry VIII and Anne Boleyn are understood in some accounts to have married on St Erkenwald's Day.

== Memorialisation of St Erkenwald ==
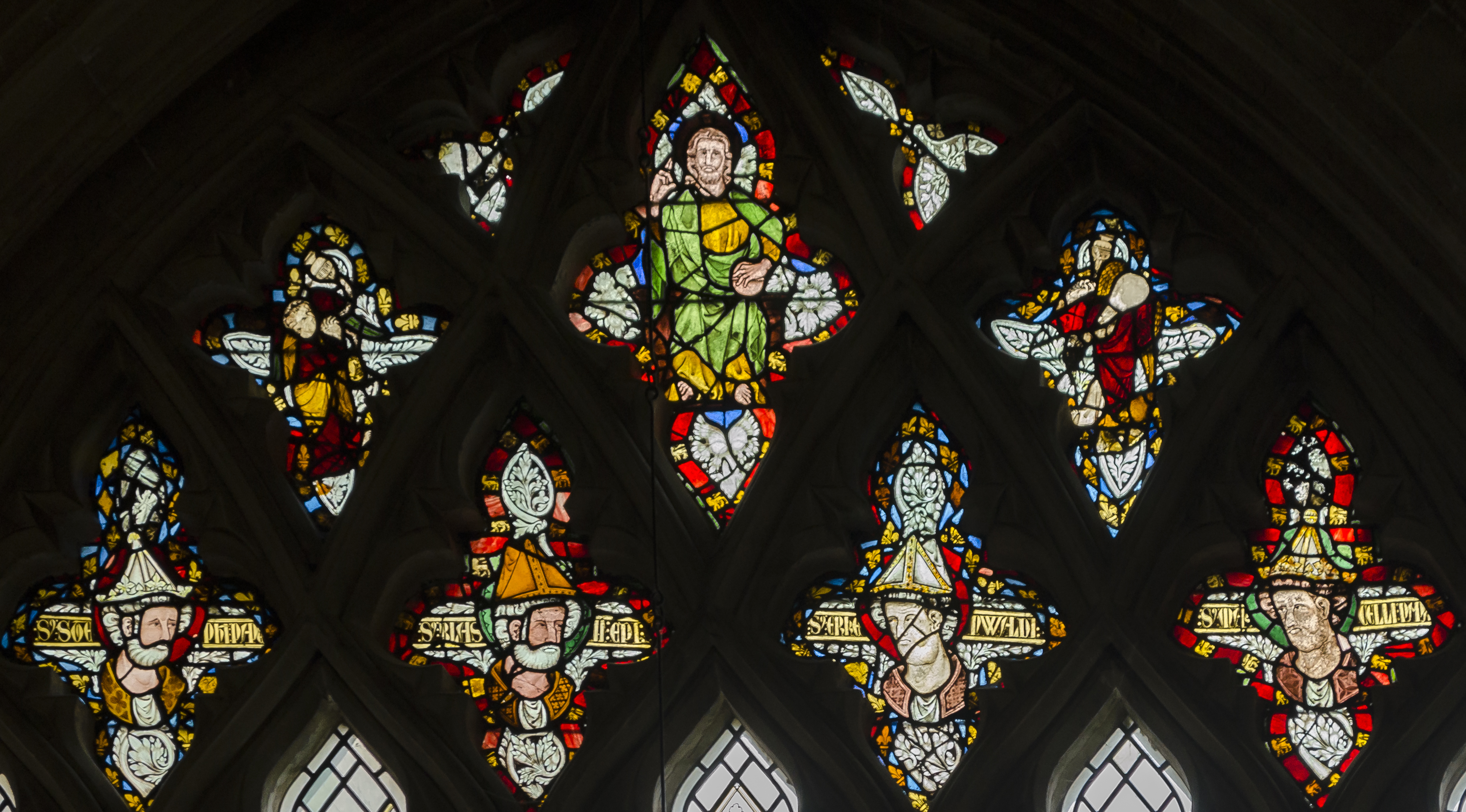
Depiction of St Erkenwald and other saints in stained glass at Wells Cathedral

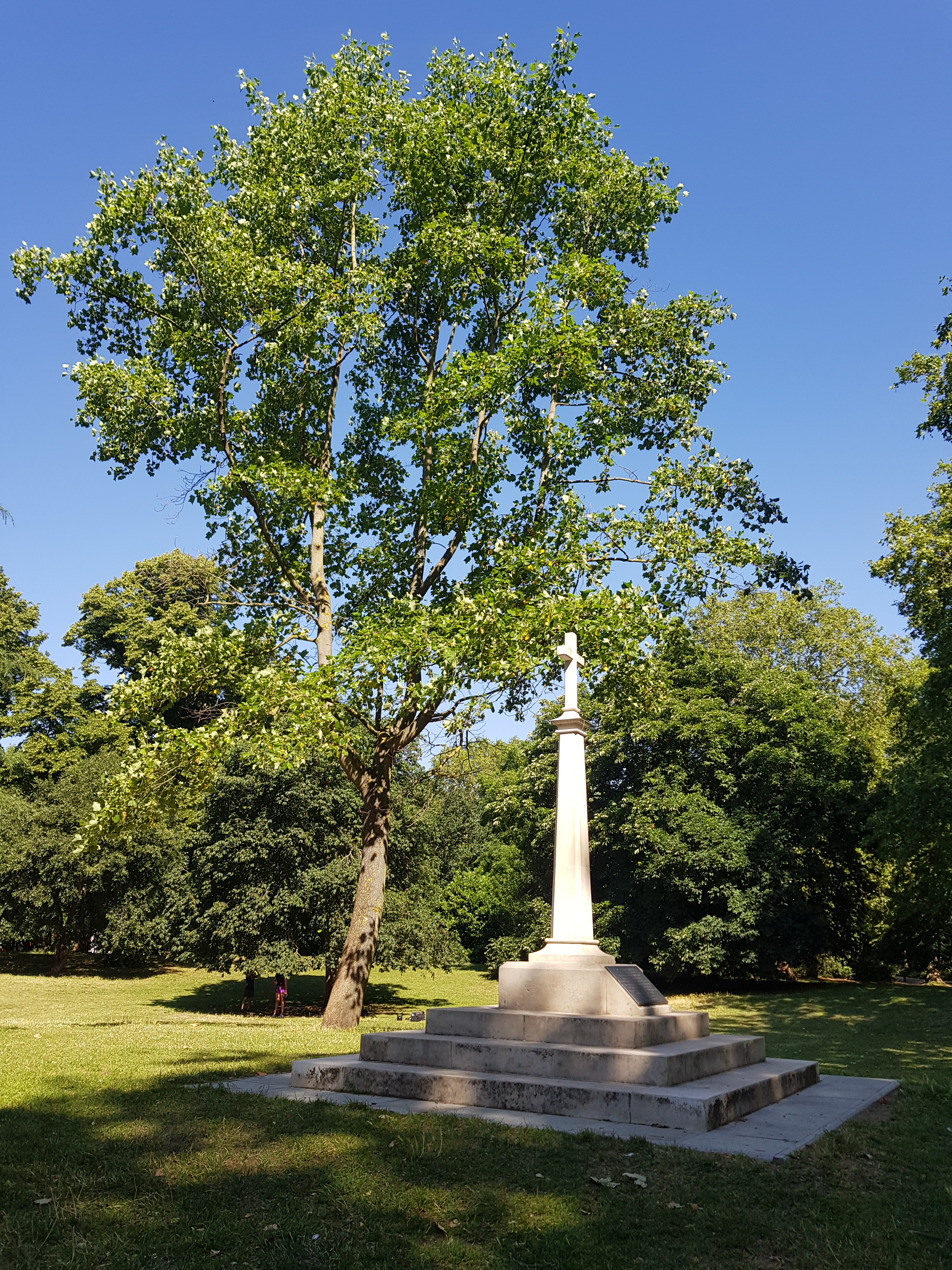
Cross in Battersea Park, erected to mark the year 2000. It stands on the site of a manor granted by King Caedwalla to St Erkenwald which is believed to have been the home of St Ethelburga.

The cult of St. Erkenwald was temporarily "marginalised" after the Norman Conquest, a period when Norman clerics replaced English ecclesiastical leaders; however, its revival at Old St. Paul's Cathedral was a profound statement of London's civic identity and a counterpoint to the royal focus on Westminster Abbey. The miracles associated with his cult were not just spiritual events but also served a practical, civic function by addressing the "educational and social needs" of the urban environment.

An anonymous author, likely a canon of St Paul's, wrote the Vita sancti Erkenwaldi (VSE) by the early 12th century. The Miracula S. Erkwenwaldi (MSE) was probably composed by Arcoid, a canon of London and nephew of Bishop Gilbert the Universal. The composition of the MSE is dated to either late 1140 or early 1141.

A key testament to Erkenwald's significance comes from William of Malmesbury, a historian from the early 12th century, who wrote:

London’s greatest saint... by no means undeserving of the favour of the canons because of the speed with which he answers

During the mid-12th century, the veneration of Erkenwald was re-established at St Paul's Cathedral. This interest continued, and around 1180, Dean Richard of Ilchester (also known as Richard of Diceto) initiated a visitation of the cathedral's estates. The record of this visitation, known as Diceto's Domesday Register (or Liber B), originally contained a copy of the Vita sancti Erkenwaldi (Life of Saint Erkenwald), according to antiquarian William Dugdale.

Historian E. Gordon Whatley suggested the Vita was included to provide historical context for early charters of St Paul's, which were also in the codex. The presence of the Vita around 1180 suggests a renewed focus on Erkenwald, which may have also been linked to efforts for his canonization, as a biography was a required document for such petitions. Further evidence of this renewed interest is seen in the fact that Master Henry of Northampton owned a maniple embroidered with portraits of both Bishop Richard de Belmeis and Erkenwald.

An inventory of the cathedral from 1245 lists a manuscript of collects and missals, ending with an office for Erkenwald.

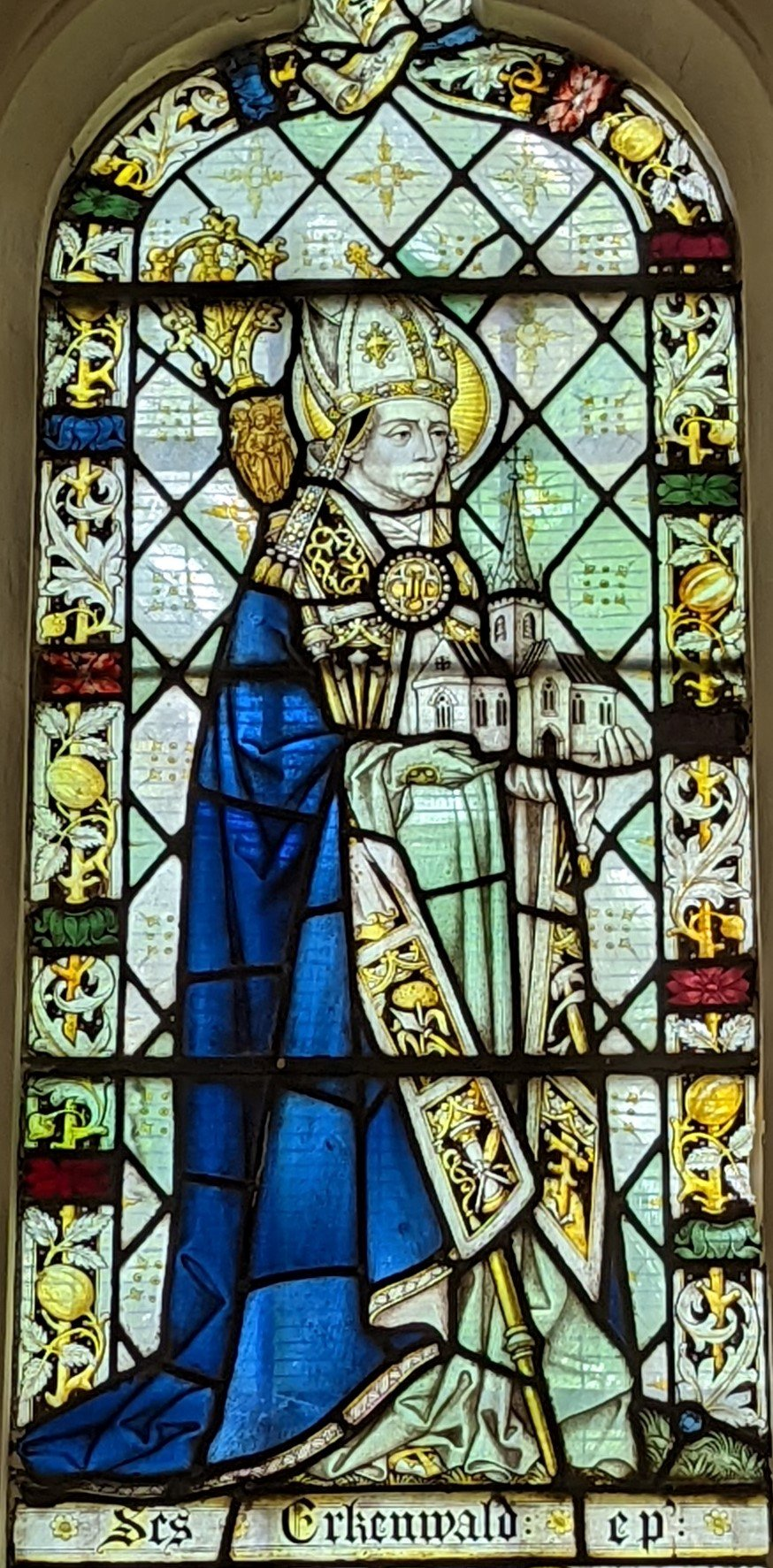
Lady Chapel of St. Margaret's Church Barking . Window for St Erkenwald

A Middle English Vita of Erkenwald was composed c.1400, which has been linked to an attempt by the bishops of London to revive the cult, suggesting that Erkenwald retained his importance for London’s cathedral clergy throughout the Middle Ages.

St Erkenwald has also been commemorated in the following ways:

- In the 1932 Barking Pageant
- in the Chapel of St Erkenwald and St Ethelburga at St Paul's Cathedral
- with a cross in Battersea Park erected in the year 2000, which was placed on the site of a manor granted to St Erkenwald by King Ceadwalla, believed to the site of the home of St Æthelburg
- St Erkenwald's Church, Barking
- St Erkenwald's Church, Southend-on-Sea (demolished)
- St Erconwald's Catholic Church Walton-on-Thames
- St Erconwald's Roman Catholic Church, Wembley
- St Paul's Cathedral holds a sung Eucharist for Erkenwald, conducted by the Bishop of London.
- Between 1931 and 1990 a senior school in Barking was called Erkenwald School. It is now a campus of Mayesbrook Park School.
- In a statue in Wells Cathedral
- In a window at St Albans Cathedral
- In an imaginatively-named Essex League Basketball team

Long Melford, Holy Trinity - Erkenwald Window

== In contemporary culture ==
In 1997 the Royal Shakespeare Company performed a play called Erkenwald in The Other Place, Stratford-upon-Avon.

Erkenwald is a supporting character in the Bernard Cornwell stories:

- The Saxon Stories novel series
- The Last Kingdom books

and in the associated 2018 television series. In that fictional world he is in service to King Alfred. The actor Kevin Eldon has portrayed him.

The British children's writer Abi Elphinstone chose "Erkenwald" as the name of a mythical kingdom in her 2021 book Sky Song.

In 2025 there was a reading of the ancient poem at Soulton Hall by Harry Frost. An ecumenical service was held at the venue on the saint's feast day in 2025, completing a three-year cycle of observances that included a Roman Catholic Mass and an Anglican Eucharist on the corresponding feast days in 2023 and 2024. The management of Soulton Hall describes its role as "heritage managers" rather than spiritual leaders, seeking to accommodate the site’s complex history with "parity of esteem." This philosophy emphasizes "responsible accommodation" and support for the traditions of the "undivided Church," providing a neutral setting for both standalone denominational services and shared ecumenical worship.

== Miracles ==
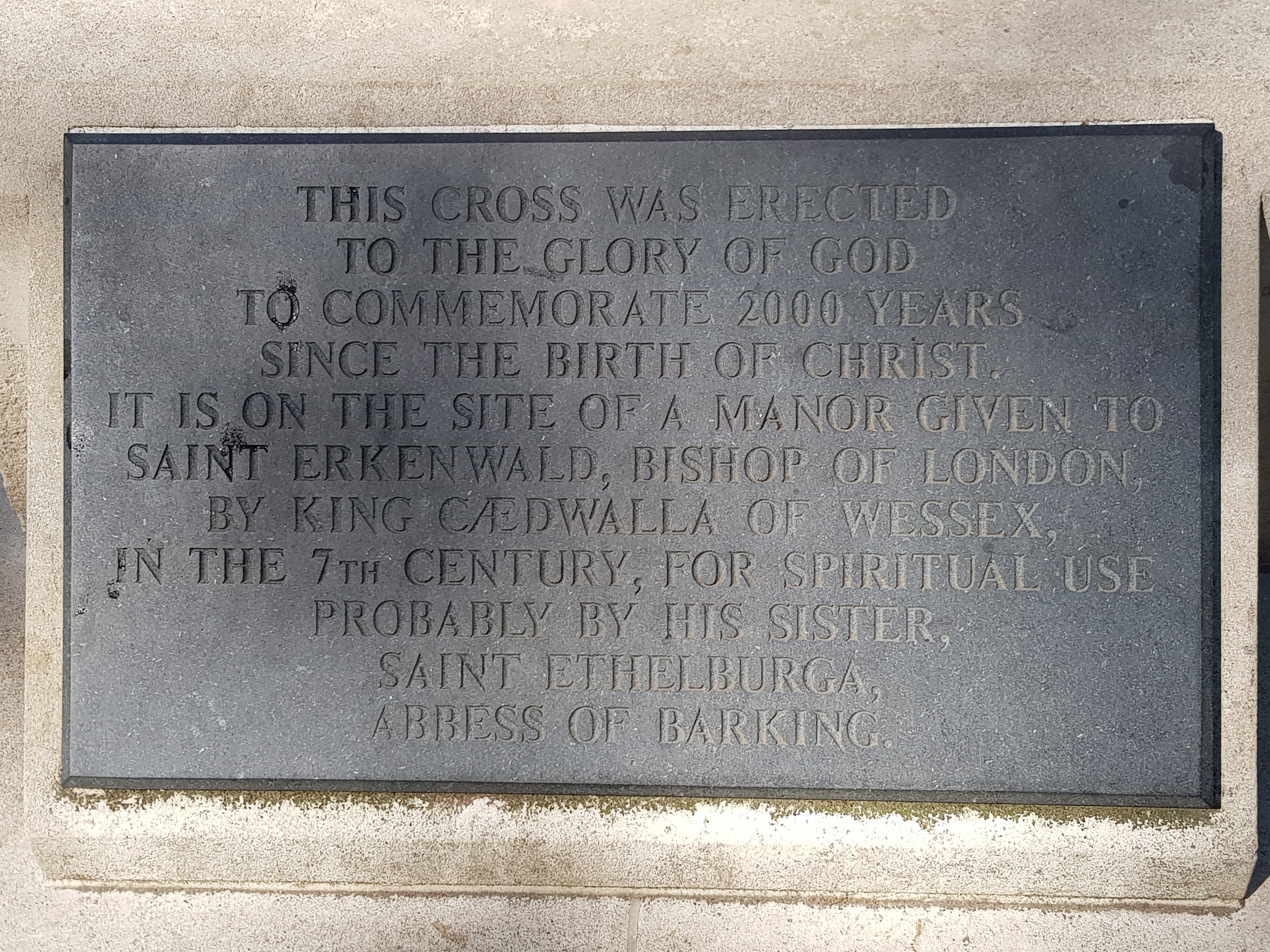
A 2000 stone plaque in London honouring St Erkenwald

There are 19 miracles associated with Erkenwald:

- a boy, who took refuge from his angry school master at the tomb of St Erkenwald, received a message he had not known until then
- a man punished with sudden death for scorning the feast day of the saint
- concerning a prisoner who was set free
- how, amid the great burning of the city and church the pall on his tomb survived unharmed
- concerning the building of a more splendid church in London, and concerning the mobility impaired person, who after journeying to many tombs of famous saints throughout the world, obtained healing from St Erkenwald
- concerning the man who prevented his wife from honouring the saint, his punishment, and the restoration of his health in accordance with the saint's instructions
- how he demonstrated, with the wonderful largesse of his merciful acts, that he was pleased with the honour being shown to him
- concerning the blind girl whose sight was speedily restored
- concerning the death of the drunken buffoon who got inside the shrine of St Erkenwald when it was under construction
- concerning the doctor, healed of deadly sickness
- concerning the blind woman who received her sight
- concerning the man who was cured of his fever by the saint, who visited him in person
- how one of the saint's painters (from when his body was in the crypt) violated his festival, was punished, the saint himself appertaining to him and declaring the reason for the punishment
- concerning the deformed nun who was visited by St Ethelburga and St Erkenwald and made whole and undeformed
- concerning the deaf girl whose hearing was restored
- Other miracles associated with an invisible wheel and growing a construction beam are recorded.

== See also ==
- St. Erkenwald (poem)
- Old St Paul's Cathedral
- Bishop of London
- Barking Abbey
- St Æthelburg
- Chertsey Abbey

== Citations ==
Christian titles
Preceded by Wine	Bishop of London; 675–693	Succeeded by Waldhere
