= Jane Warton =

Jane Warton may refer to

- Jane Warton (writer) (1724–1809), British writer
- Lady Constance Bulwer-Lytton (1869–1923), British suffragist who used "Jane Warton" as an alias
