= Jean Jones (artist) =

English artist

Jean Verity Jones (5 July 1927 – 28 April 2012) was an English painter who spent the majority of her life living in Oxford, Devon and Primrose Hill. She produced over 400 artworks, including a variety of landscapes, portraits, self-portraits and still lifes, which engage varyingly with the legacies of Expressionism and Post-Impressionism. Her paintings are particularly noted for their "poetic" and "lyrical" qualities, providing a "diary" of her geographical, emotional and psychological development.

Throughout her life, Jones suffered from mental illnesses including bipolar disorder, depression, and anxiety. Her difficulties with mental health severely limited the progression of her artistic career, and she was twice sectioned – with the GP on the occasion of her second sectioning describing her as "a woman who wears man's clothes". Nonetheless, her talents were recognised throughout her lifetime. Jones had a solo exhibition at the Ashmolean Museum in 1980, as well as notable reviews from David Carritt and K.J. Garlick. The British novelist and philosopher Iris Murdoch even claimed that Jones would one day be 'as famous as Van Gogh'.

== Biography ==
Jones was born in London on 5 July 1927 to Ella and Samuel Robinson, "a successful but modest senior civil servant". Her only brother, John Armstrong Robinson also became a civil servant, serving most notably as Head of Britain's European Integration Department from 1968 to 1970, and Assistant Under-Secretary of State from 1971 to 1973.

After leaving school, Jones briefly attended Saint Martin's School of Art in London, where she studied under the tutelage of Ruskin Spear, before opting to put aside her passion for painting, and matriculating at Girton College, Cambridge, where she read English. She later married John Jones, a Fellow of Merton College, Oxford and later the 38th Oxford Professor of Poetry (1978–83) and moved to Oxford with her new husband immediately, taking up residence in Holywell Cottage on St Cross Road. The marriage produced two children, Jeremy and Janet.

In the early 1960s, after reading the letters of Vincent van Gogh, Jones was inspired to resume her interest in painting. Jones's work is deeply engaged in the significant places of her life, in particular her surroundings in Primrose Hill, Oxford and the Devon countryside. David Carritt has described her "as an Expressionist, albeit a most restrained, unstrident Expressionist," identifying in her work a characteristic array of "lyrical feelings – usually of happiness, sometimes of melancholy." Jones's work often features the same settings, which 'she paint[ed] again and again, noting every change wrought by light and season but recording, too, the emotion which these changes awaken in her" and documenting "a world of becoming, not being".

Jones's work was the subject of a 1980 solo exhibition at Oxford's Ashmolean Museum. She also exhibited at the Bear Lane Gallery in Oxford and with the New Grafton and Boundary Galleries. In 1999, Duncan Campbell Contemporary Art held a studio sale of her work. During her lifetime, those in possession of Jones's work included the Tolkien family, the Golding estate, as well as the critic John Carey, the Bishop John Oliver, the mathematician Harry Pitt, the literary agent and publisher Hilary Rubinstein, the novelist and academic Rachel Trickett, the American author and critic Diana Trilling and academics Andrew Wallace-Hadrill and J.M. Wallace-Hadrill.

In October 2020, a team led by Jones's grandson organised the first exhibition of her work in over twenty years at The Brownston Gallery, Modbury.
