= Hermitage Hotel, Bournemouth =

Hotel in Bournemouth, Dorset, England

Coordinates: 50.717469°N 1.876883°W

The Hermitage Hotel
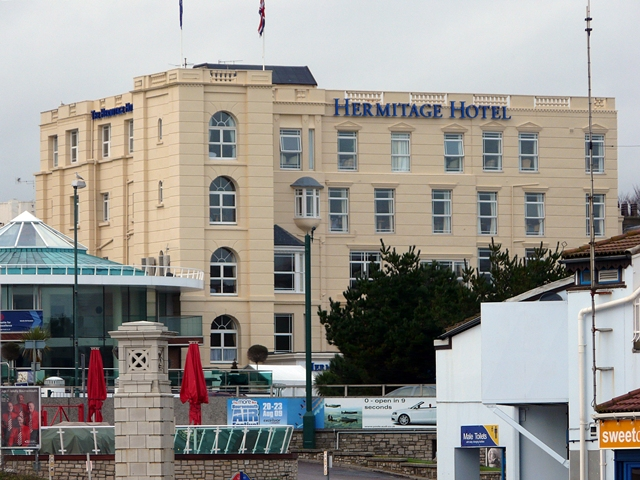
- The hotel pictured in 2008

General information
- Architectural style: Italianate architecture
- Location: Bournemouth, United Kingdom
- Year built: circa 1850

Website
- www.hermitage-hotel.co.uk

The Hermitage Hotel is a historic hotel in Bournemouth, Dorset, England. The hotel is located in the town centre near other landmarks including the Pavilion Theatre, the Bournemouth International Centre, Bournemouth Pier, the Royal Exeter Hotel and the Royal Bath Hotel.

== History ==
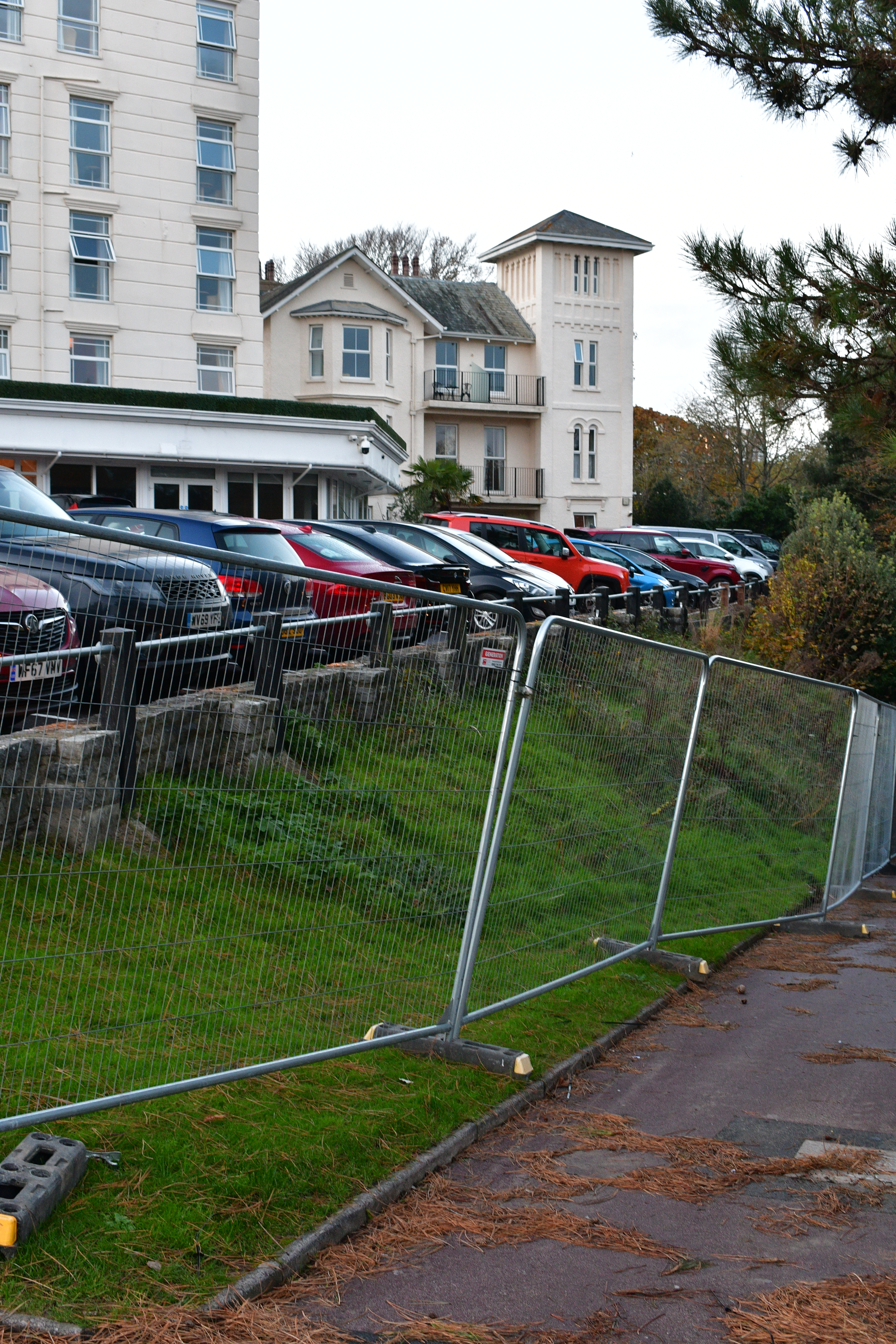
Brookside Cottage in 2021

The Hermitage Hotel dates from the 19th century. One part of the hotel, historically known as Brookside, is a Grade II listed building. Historic England, now lists it as Brookside and Brookside Cottage, and describes the building as an Italianate stucco villa with Moorish type windows and overhanging eaves with views of Bournemouth Gardens. The four-storey tower is capped by a pyramidical roof. On 29 March 1866, the priest and poet John Keble died at the hotel. By 1934 the hotel had installed a passenger lift to all floors and central heating in every bedroom.

In 2006, the owner of the hotel was in dispute with Bournemouth Borough Council in a row over approximately one metre of land. In 2016, the rotunda restaurant reopened after a decade of disuse. The same year planning permission was applied for to build an extra storey for eight holiday flats. Today the hotel has two restaurants.
