= The Christian Year =

1827 series of poems by John Keble

The Christian Year is a series of poems for all the Sundays and some other feasts of the liturgical year of the Church of England written by John Keble in 1827. The book is the source for several hymns.

It was first published in 1827, and quickly became extremely popular. Though at first anonymous, its authorship soon became known, with the result that Keble was in 1831 appointed Oxford Professor of Poetry, a post that he held until 1841.

In his book Heaven, Hell, and the Victorians, Victorian scholar Michael Wheeler calls The Christian Year simply "the most popular volume of verse in the nineteenth century". In his essay on "Tractarian Aesthetics and the Romantic Tradition," Gregory Goodwin claims that The Christian Year is "Keble's greatest contribution to the Oxford Movement and to English literature." As evidence of that, Goodwin cites E. B. Pusey's report that ninety-five editions of this devotional text were printed during Keble's lifetime, and "at the end of the year following his death, the number had arisen to a hundred-and-nine." By the time the copyright expired in 1873, over 375,000 copies had been sold in Britain and 158 editions had been published. Despite its widespread appeal among the Victorian readers, the popularity of Keble's The Christian Year quickly faded in the twentieth century.
