= Jane Warton (writer) =

British writer (bap. 1724–1809)

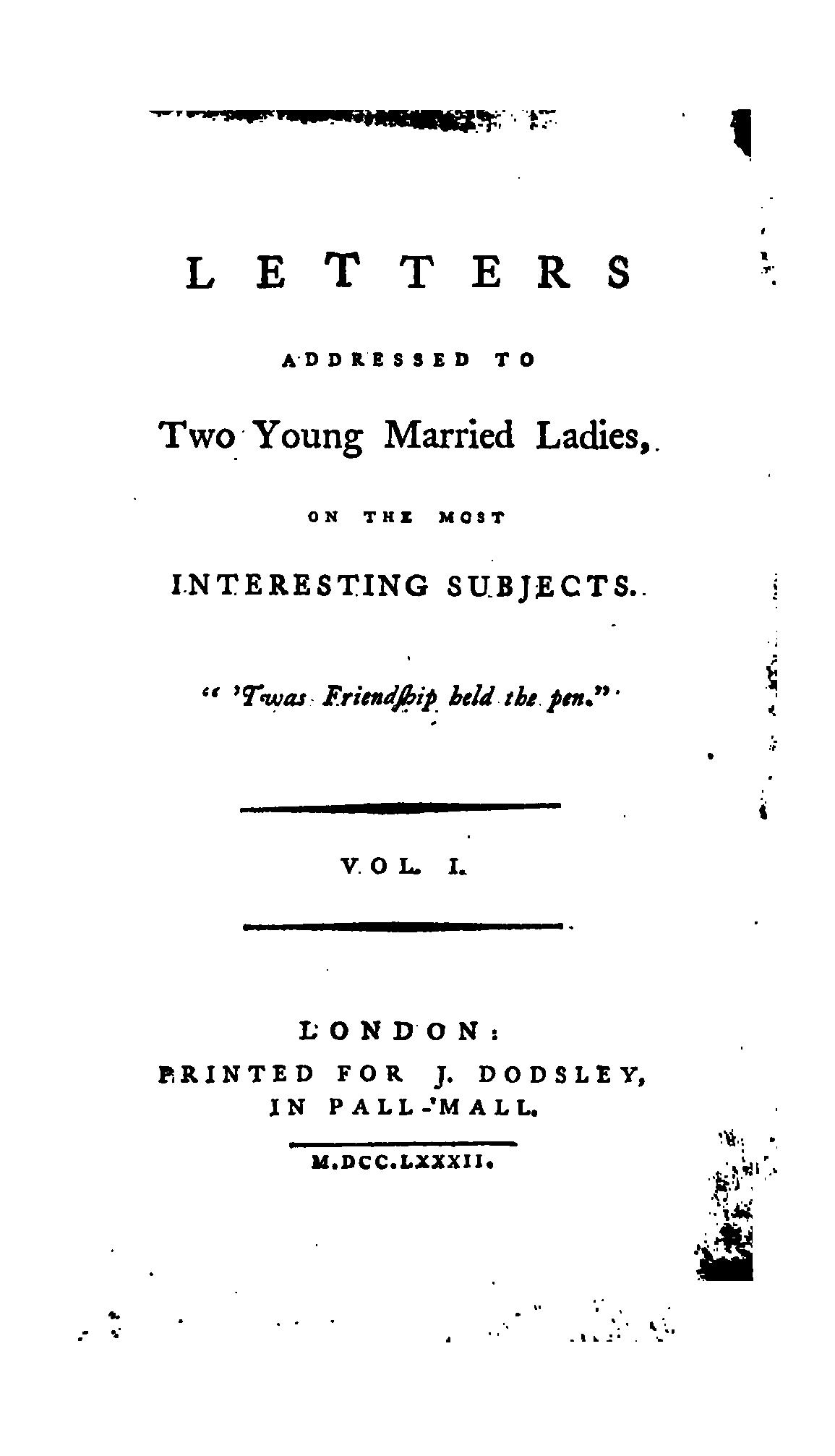
- Title page, Jane Warton, Letters Addressed to Two Young Married Ladies, on the Most Interesting Subjects (2 vols., London: J. Dodsley, 1784)
- Born: August 1724; Basingstoke, Hampshire, England
- Died: 3 November 1809 (aged 85); Wickham, Hampshire, England
- Occupation: Writer
- Parent: Thomas Warton (father)
- Relatives: Joseph Warton (brother); Thomas Warton (brother)

Jane Warton (bap. 1724 – 3 November 1809) was a British writer. She published poetry, essays, conduct literature, and a novel. Other family members were also involved in literature writing.

== Life ==
Jane Warton was the daughter of Thomas (1688–1745) and Elizabeth (1691–1762) Warton. She was baptized in 1724 in Basingstoke, Hampshire, where her father was vicar and master of the grammar school. She was one of three children: she had an elder brother, Joseph (1722–1800), and a younger, Thomas (1728–1790). The family was intellectual, literary, and educated: Thomas Warton Sr. was the second professor of poetry at Oxford, though it seems to have been a political appointment, and both sons, after their own Oxford educations, went on to become respected "men of letters." Warton's literary ambitions were encouraged within the family, and while she published anonymously, her identity was not hidden.

By the age of eighteen, Warton contracted what was likely rheumatic fever, with life-long consequences to her health.

In 1753 she took a position as governess to the Misses Thoyts, Joan (b. 1747) and Mary Anne (b. 1749), of Whitechapel and Carshalton. Her first major publication, Letters Addressed to Two Young Married Ladies, on the Most Interesting Subjects (1784) was addressed to the sisters and she maintained a lifelong connection to them.

She was part of a wider literary community, notably through her friendship with Hester Chapone.

She never married. Very little else is known of her life.

== Writing ==
Warton contributed essays and poems to several collections as well as to periodicals such as Adventurer, the Gentleman's Magazine, and European Magazine. She and her brothers maintained an active correspondence throughout their lives in which they frequently discussed literary topics. Her first major publication, Letters Addressed to Two Young Married Ladies, on the Most Interesting Subjects (2 vols., 1784, published anonymously), is conduct literature, focused on the role of women as wives and particularly mothers in their central role of educating their children. Such texts were popular, and in fact Warton's text was pirated by an American publisher who sought to pass it off as the work of the better known Elizabeth Griffith.

Her novel, Peggy and Patty, or, The Sisters of Ashdale (James Dodsley, 1783), explores the sexual double standard by following the fates of the two protagonists, country girls who are seduced and abandoned after travelling to the city. "This novel both makes clear her identification with the Wollstonecraftian feminism of her own time and, in its sympathy for the fallen woman, anticipates the preoccupations of Victorian feminists." The work is also notable for having labouring-class heroines. The novel went into several editions though the reviews were "tepid" and publisher James Dodsley declined further work from her.

== Works ==
- Peggy and Patty, or, The Sisters of Ashdale (4 vols., London: J. Dodsley, 1783)
- Letters Addressed to Two Young Married Ladies, on the Most Interesting Subjects (2 vols., London: J. Dodsley, 1784)

== Electronic texts ==
- Letters Addressed to Two Young Married Ladies, on the Most Interesting Subjects (2 vols., 1784) available at the Internet Archive: Vol. I; Vol. II
- Peggy and Patty, or, The Sisters of Ashdale (4 vols., London: J. Dodsley, 1783) available at the Internet Archive: Vol. I; Vol. II; Vol. III; Vol. IV
