= Adam Fox (poet) =

British poet and academic (1883–1977)

Adam Fox (15 July 1883 – 17 January 1977), Canon, was the Dean of Divinity at Magdalen College, Oxford. He was one of the first members of the literary group "Inklings". He was Oxford Professor of Poetry and later he became Canon of Westminster Abbey. He was also warden of Radley College.

== Education and academic career ==
He and his twin sister Eve were born to a sea captain and his wife. He was educated at Winchester College and University College, Oxford, graduating BA in 1906 (MA in 1909); he then trained for the priesthood at Cuddesdon College, and was ordained deacon in 1911, priest in 1913.

He was an assistant master at Lancing College (1906–1918), then headmaster of Radley College (1918–1924). He then taught at Diocesan College, Rondebosch, South Africa until 1929, when he returned to England as Dean of Divinity of Magdalen College, Oxford until 1942; between 1938 and 1942 he was Oxford Professor of Poetry. Later he became Canon of Westminster Abbey and he is buried there in Poets' Corner.

== Writing career ==
During his time at Oxford, he wrote his long poem in four books "Old King Coel". It gets its name from King Cole, legendary British father of the Roman Empress Helena, the mother of the Emperor Constantine. As Professor of Poetry, Fox advocated poetry which is intelligible to readers, and gives enough pleasure to be read again.

He was one of the first members of the "Inklings", a literary group which also included C. S. Lewis and J. R. R. Tolkien. In his 1945 Plato for Pleasure, he tried to introduce the general public to Plato. Fox wished to make Plato well known among the English Classics once again and hoped that people would study the platonic dialogues, as well as the plays of Shakespeare. His biography of William Ralph Inge, the theologian, philosopher and Dean of St. Paul's Cathedral, was awarded the 1960 James Tait Black Memorial Prize soon after its publication.

The (UK) Times of 19 Jan 1977 (issue No. 59911) carries a detailed obituary.

== Publications ==
Fox’s works include;

- Old King Coel (1937)
- Plato for Pleasure (1945)
- English hymns and hymn writers ( W. Collins, London, 1947)
- Plato and the Christians (1957)
- God is an artist (1957)
- Life of Dean Inge (1960)
- The Pictorial History of Westminster Abbey (Pitkin Pictorials, London, 1966)
- Sacred and Secular (editor) (1975)
