= James Garbett =

British academic and Anglican cleric

James Garbett (1802-1879) was a British academic and Anglican cleric who became the Archdeacon of Chichester.

He was a Fellow of Brasenose College, Oxford. He was an Evangelical and an opponent of the Oxford Movement.

He was the anti-Tractarian candidate in the election of the Professor of Poetry in 1841/2. The 'Oxford Movement' candidate to replace John Keble in that position was Isaac Williams. Slender as his credentials were for the post, Garbett won, in a politicised campaign run by Ashurst Turner Gilbert, Principal of Brasenose.

He was appointed Archdeacon of Chichester in 1851 and served until 1879.

In his book Diocesan Synods and Convocation he argued for the abolition of synods.

== Works ==
- Christ, as Prophet, Priest, and King: being a Vindication of the Church of England from Theological Novelties (1842) Bampton Lectures
- De Rei Poeticae Idea (1843)
- The Temple Better than the Gold: a sermon (1844)
- Christ the Foundation of the Church: a sermon (1844)
- De Re Critica Praelectiones Oxonii Habitae (1847)
- Diocesan Synods and Convocation (1852)
- The Beatitudes of the Mount, in seventeen sermons (1854)
- The Irish Church Debate (1868)
