= John Keble =

English Anglican priest and poet (1792–1866)

The Reverend John Keble
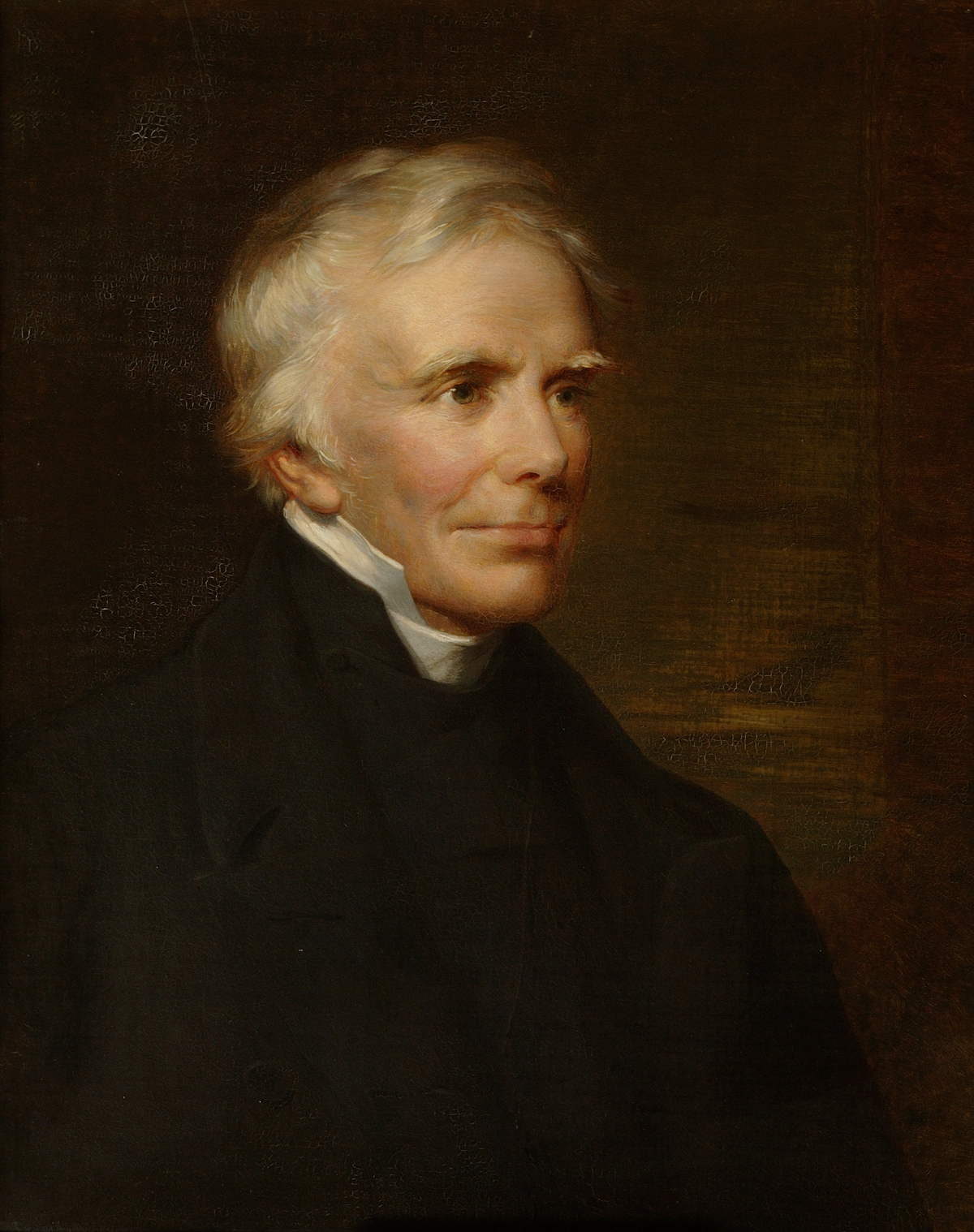
- Born: 25 April 1792; Fairford, England
- Died: 29 March 1866 (aged 73); Bournemouth, England
- Notable work: The Christian Year (1827); "National Apostasy" (1833)
- Movement: Oxford Movement
- Spouse: Charlotte Clarke (m. 1835)

Ecclesiastical career
- Religion: Christianity (Anglican)
- Church: Church of England
- Ordained: 1815 (deacon); 1816 (priest)

Academic background
- Education: Corpus Christi College, Oxford

Academic work
- Discipline: Literature
- Sub-discipline: Poetry
- Institutions: Oriel College, Oxford

John Keble (Note: Pronounced /ˈkiːbəl/.) (25 April 1792 – 29 March 1866) was an English Anglican priest and poet who was one of the leaders of the Oxford Movement. Keble College, Oxford, is named after him.

== Early life ==
Keble was born on 25 April 1792 in Fairford, Gloucestershire, where his father, also named John Keble, was vicar of Coln St. Aldwyns. He and his brother Thomas were educated at home by their father until each went to Oxford. In 1806, Keble won a scholarship to Corpus Christi College, Oxford. He excelled in his studies and in 1810 achieved double first-class honours in both Latin and mathematics. In 1811, he won the university prizes for both the English and Latin essays and became a fellow of Oriel College. He was for some years a tutor and examiner at the University of Oxford.

While still at Oxford, he was ordained in 1816, becoming a curate to his father and then curate of St Michael and St Martin's Church, Eastleach Martin, in Gloucestershire while still residing at Oxford. On the death of his mother in 1823, he left Oxford and returned to live with his father and two surviving sisters at Fairford.

Between 1824 and 1835, he was three times offered a position and each time declined on the grounds that he ought not separate himself from his father and only surviving sister. In 1828, he was nominated as provost of Oriel College but not elected.

== The Christian Year ==
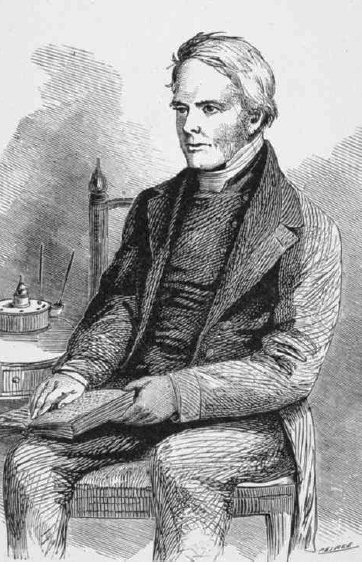
Keble, c. 1832

Meanwhile, Keble had been writing The Christian Year, a book of poems for the Sundays and feast days of the church year. It appeared in 1827 and was effective in spreading Keble's devotional and theological views. It was intended as an aid to meditation and devotion following the services of the Prayer Book. Though at first anonymous, its authorship soon became known, with Keble in 1831 appointed to the Chair of Poetry at Oxford, which he held until 1841. Victorian scholar Michael Wheeler calls The Christian Year simply "the most popular volume of verse in the nineteenth century". In his essay on Tractarian Aesthetics and the Romantic Tradition, Gregory Goodwin claims that The Christian Year is "Keble's greatest contribution to the Oxford Movement and to English literature." As evidence, Goodwin cites E. B. Pusey's report that 95 editions of this devotional text were printed during Keble's lifetime, and "at the end of the year following his death, the number had arisen to a hundred-and-nine".

At Oxford, Keble met John Taylor Coleridge who introduced him to the writings not only of his uncle, Samuel Taylor Coleridge, but also of Wordsworth. He dedicated his Praelectiones to and greatly admired Wordsworth, who once offered to go over The Christian Year with a view to correcting the English. To the same college friend, he was indebted for an introduction to Robert Southey, whom he found to be "a noble and delightful character," and the writings of the three, especially Wordsworth, had much to do with the formation of Keble's own mind as a poet.

== Tractarianism and vicar of Hursley ==
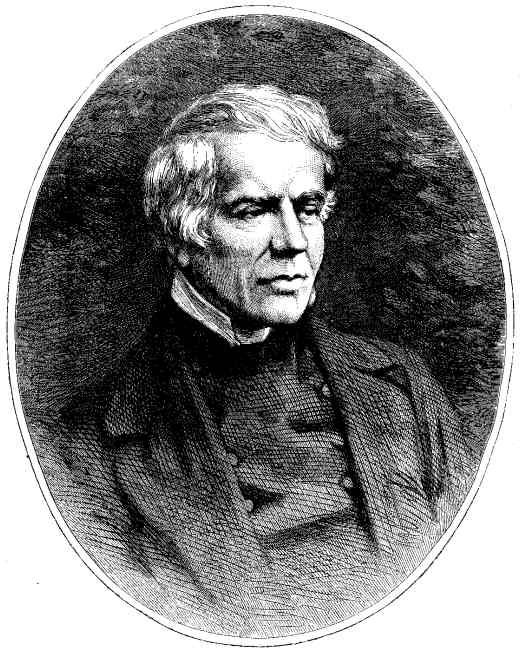
Keble, c. 1860

Delivered on 14 July 1833, his famous Assize Sermon on "National Apostasy" gave the first impulse to the Oxford Movement, also known as the Tractarian movement. It marked the opening of a term of the civil and criminal courts and is officially addressed to the judges and officers of the court, exhorting them to deal justly. Keble contributed seven pieces for Tracts for the Times, a series of short papers dealing with faith and practice. Along with his colleagues, including John Henry Newman and Edward Pusey, he became a leading light in the movement but did not follow Newman into the Roman Catholic Church.

In 1835, his father died, and Keble and his sister retired from Fairford to Coln. In the same year he married Charlotte Clarke, and the vicarage of Hursley in Hampshire, becoming vacant, was offered to him; he accepted. In 1836, he settled in Hursley and remained for the rest of his life as a parish priest at All Saints' Church. In 1841 his neighbour Charlotte Mary Yonge, a resident at Otterbourne House in the adjacent village of Otterbourne, where Keble was responsible for building a new church, compiled The Child's Christian Year: Hymns for every Sunday and Holy-Day to which Keble contributed four poems, including Bethlehem, above all cities blest.

In 1857, he wrote one of his more important works, his treatise on Eucharistical Adoration, written in support of George Denison, who had been attacked for his views on the Eucharist.

== Other writings ==
In 1836, he published his edition of Hooker's Works. In 1838, he began to edit, in conjunction with Edward Bouverie Pusey and John Henry Newman, the Library of the Fathers. A volume of Academical and Occasional Sermons appeared in 1847. Other works were a Life of Wilson, Bishop of Sodor and Man. After his death, Letters of Spiritual Counsel and 12 volumes of Parish Sermons were published.

Extracts from a number of his verses found their way into popular collections of Hymns for Public Worship, such as "The Voice that Breathed o'er Eden", "Sun of my soul, Thou Saviour dear", Blest are the pure in heart and New every morning is the love.

Lyra Innocentium was being composed while Keble was stricken by what he always seems to have regarded as the great sorrow of his life, the decision of Newman to leave the Church of England for Catholicism.

== Death ==
Keble died in Bournemouth on 29 March 1866 at the Hermitage Hotel, after visiting the area to try and recover from a long-term illness as he believed the sea air had therapeutic qualities. He is buried in All Saints' churchyard, Hursley.

== Legacy ==
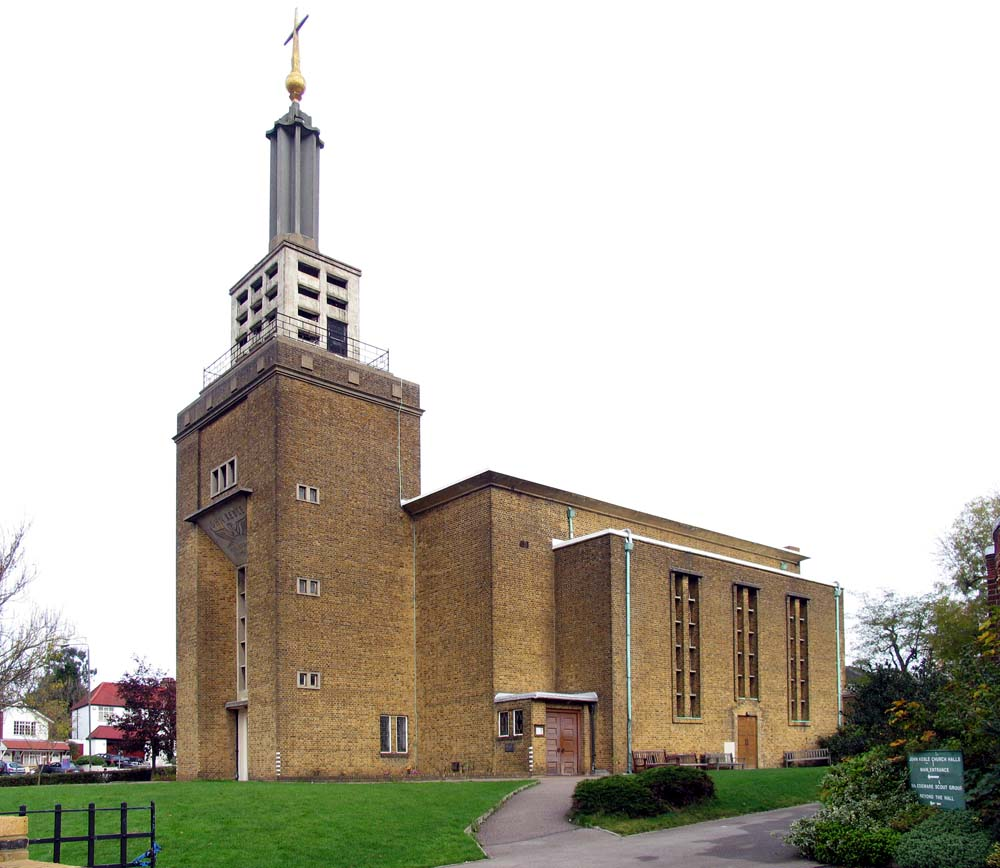
John Keble Church, Mill Hill in north London

Keble has been described thus:

He was absolutely without ambition, with no care for the possession of power or influence, hating show and excitement, and distrustful of his own abilities.... Though shy and awkward with strangers, he was happy and at ease among his friends, and their love and sympathy drew out all his droll playfulness of wit and manner.... In personal appearance he was about middle height, with rather square and sloping shoulders, which made him look short until he pulled himself up, as he often did with 'sprightly dignity.' His head, says Mozley, 'was one of the most beautifully formed heads in the world,' the face rather plain-featured, with a large unshapely mouth, but the whole redeemed by a bright smile which played naturally over the lips; and under a broad and smooth forehead he had 'clear, brilliant, penetrating eyes which lighted up quickly with merriment kindled into fire in a moment of indignation.... a quiet country clergyman, with a very moderate income, who sedulously avoided public distinctions, and held tenaciously to an unpopular School all his life.

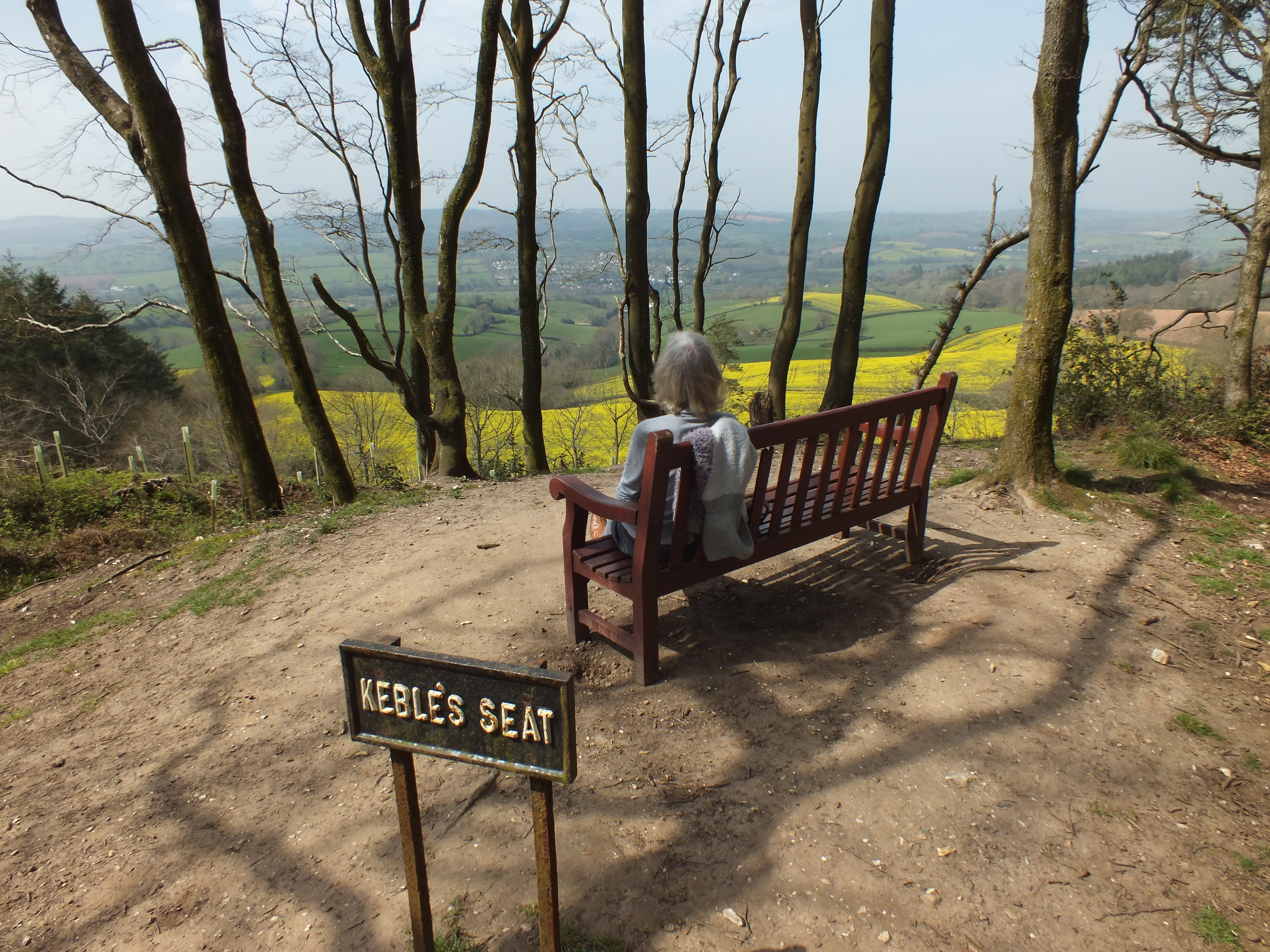
Keble's Seat at Bulverton Hill, Sidmouth

John Keble is remembered in the Church of England with a Lesser Festival on 14 July (the anniversary of his Assize Sermon), and a commemoration observed on 29 March (the anniversary of his death) elsewhere in the Anglican Communion. Keble College, Oxford, was founded in his memory, and John Keble Church, Mill Hill, and the ancient clapper bridge over the River Leach near the church in which he was curate in the village of Eastleach Martin were named after him.

The view from Bulverton Hill, Sidmouth, where Keble was a frequent visitor, is thought to have inspired some of his best loved work. The hill commands a panoramic view of the Lower Otter Valley and Dartmoor in the distance. Folklore suggests that his favourite spot was where a wooden bench known as Keble's Seat has been in place for many years.

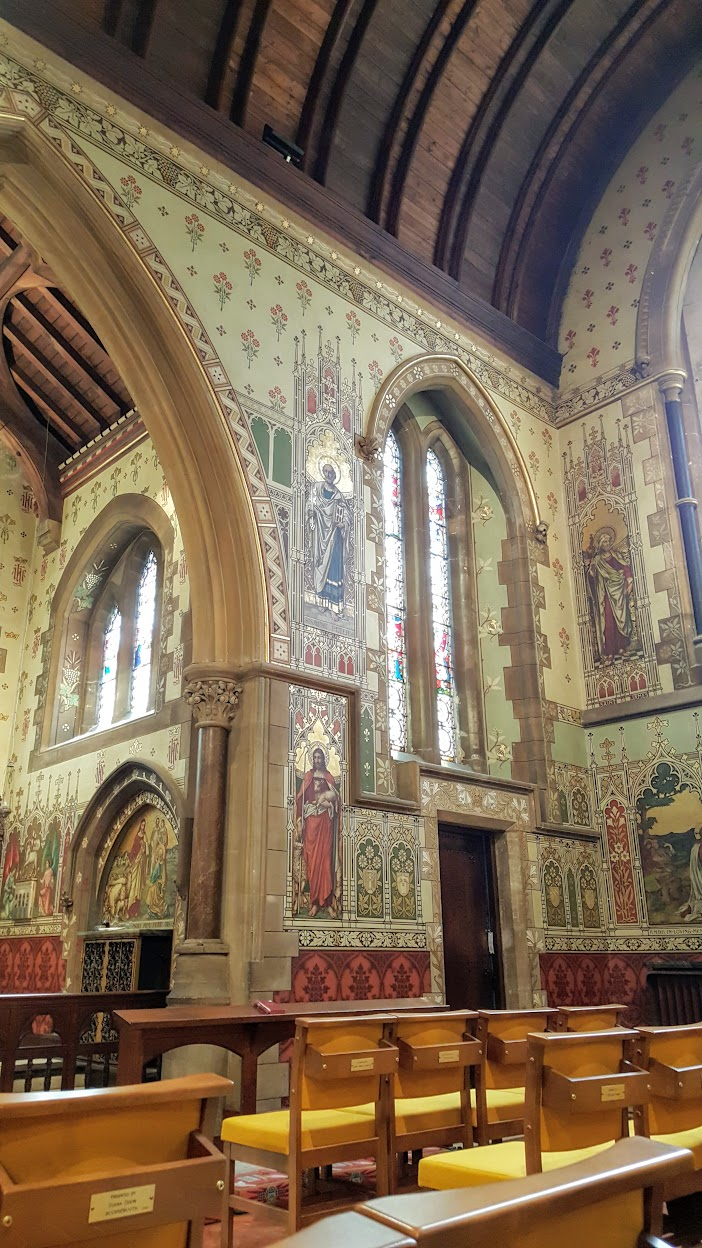
The Keble Chapel in St Peter's Church, Bournemouth

The 'Te Deum' window in the south-east transept of St Peter's Church, Bournemouth, was commissioned as a memorial to Keble, who had preferred to sit in the transept when worshipping at St Peter's daily in the last months of his life. Later, in 1906, the transept was re-configured as the Keble Chapel.

Lives of Keble include one by John Taylor Coleridge (1869), who said, "The Christian Year is so wonderfully scriptural. Keble's mind was, by long, patient and affectionate study of Scripture, so imbued with it that its language, its train of thought, its mode of reasoning, seems to flow out into his poetry, almost, one should think, unconsciously to himself." Another is by Walter Lock (1895). In 1963 Georgina Battiscombe wrote a biography titled John Keble: A Study in Limitations.

== Notes ==
Academic offices
Preceded by Henry Hart Milman	Professor of Poetry; 1831–1841	Succeeded by James Garbett
