= Thomas Warton the elder =

English clergyman and schoolmaster

Thomas Warton, the elder (c. 1688 – 10 September 1745), was an English clergyman and schoolmaster, known as the second professor of poetry at Oxford, a position he owed to Jacobite sympathies.

== Life ==
He was born about 1688, son of Antony Warton (1650–1715), vicar of Godalming. He matriculated at Hart Hall, Oxford, on 3 April 1706, but soon migrated to Magdalen College, where he held a demyship from 1706 to 1717, and a fellowship from 1717 to 1724. He graduated B.A. on 17 February 1710, M.A. in 1712, and B.D. in 1725.

In 1717-18, Warton circulated both in manuscript and in print a satire in verse on George I, which he entitled The Turnip Hoer, and wrote lines for the "Old Pretender" James III's picture. No copy of either composition is now known. His Jacobite sympathies made him popular in the university, and he was elected professor of poetry, in succession to Joseph Trapp, on 17 July 1718. He was re-elected, in spite of the opposition of the Constitution Club, for a second term of five years in 1723. He retired from the professorship in 1728. He possessed small literary qualifications for the office, and his election provoked the sarcasm of Nicholas Amhurst, who satirized Warton across three numbers of his Terrae Filius; "Squeaking Tom of Maudlin" is the sobriquet Amhurst conferred on him.

After 1723 Warton ceased to reside regularly in Oxford. In that year he became vicar of Basingstoke, Hampshire, and master of the grammar school there. Among his pupils was the naturalist Gilbert White.

He remained at Basingstoke until his death, but with the living he held successively the vicarages of Woking, Surrey, from 1727, and of Chobham, Surrey, from 1730. He died at Basingstoke on 10 September 1745, and was buried in the church there.

== Family ==
He married Elizabeth, second daughter of Joseph Richardson, rector of Dunsfold, Surrey, and left two sons, Joseph Warton and the better-known Thomas Warton, and a daughter, Jane Warton.

== Works ==
Warton was a writer of occasional verse, but published none collectively in his lifetime. After his death his son Joseph issued, by subscription, Poems on several Occasions by the Rev. Thomas Warton, London, 1748. Some 'runic' odes are included, and are said to have drawn the attention of the poet Thomas Gray to those topics. The chronology of his work has been discussed.
