= Bulverton =

Hamlet in Devon, England

Coordinates: 50.692°N 3.248°W

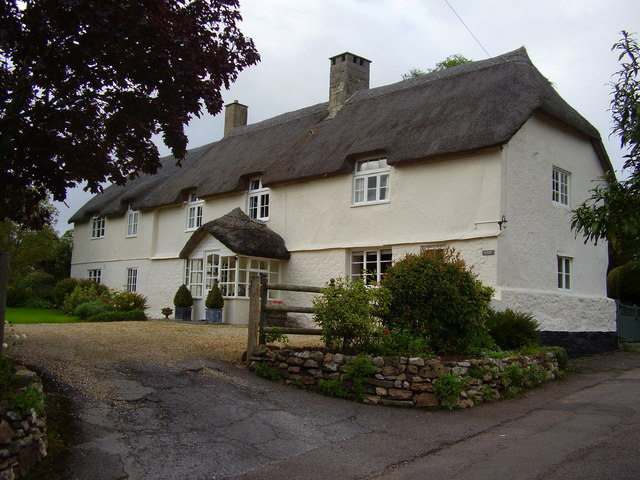
- Cottage in Bulverton (Dark lane)

- Location within Devon
- OS grid reference: SY119888
- Civil parish: Sidmouth
- District: East Devon
- Shire county: Devon
- Region: South West
- Country: England
- Sovereign state: United Kingdom
- Post town: SIDMOUTH
- Postcode district: EX10
- Dialling code: 01395
- Police: Devon and Cornwall
- Fire: Devon and Somerset
- Ambulance: South Western
- UK Parliament: Honiton and Sidmouth

Bulverton is a small hamlet on the outskirts of Sidmouth, Devon, England.

== Area information ==
Bulverton comprises low-density residential housing, areas of farmland and a wooded plantation and is connected by road to Sidmouth by the B3176.

During the Sidmouth Folk Festival the area is the location of the Bulverton Late Night Extra.

Since 1963 much of the Bulverton area has fallen under the East Devon Area of Outstanding Natural Beauty:

The East Devon Area of Outstanding Natural Beauty (AONB) landscape is characterised by intimate wooded combes, vast areas of heathland, fertile river valleys and breathtaking cliffs or hilltops. It includes the East Devon section of the Jurassic Coast - England's first natural World Heritage Site - and is a living, working landscape shaped by many centuries of farming activity.

== History ==
At the time of William the Conqueror, the hamlet formed part of the extensive Otterton Manor lands, owned by the monastery of Mont-Saint-Michel in Normandy. The Otterton Cartulary, which listed ecclesiastical holdings in the medieval period, records "Eduart de Boluorton" and "Ricard de Boluorton" ploughing ferlings (Note: A ferling or ferthing was a quarter of a quarter. It usually referred to an area of land equal to approximately one sixteenth of a hide.) for the prior. In 1415 Bulverton and other land and possessions of the Otterton Manor passed to the Abbey of Sion in Middlesex. By the reign of Edward IV, Bulverton is listed within the Manor of Sidmouth, but the tenants still owed fealty to the Abbess of Sion. The Manor Court Roll of 1467 recorded that William Goule of Bolferton fell foul of the local assize when he was caught brewing inferior ale by the ale-taster and duly fined. After the Dissolution of the monasteries, the Manor of Sidmouth, including the farms at Bulverton, passed into private ownership. In the late 18th Century, the Manor of Sidmouth was acquired by Thomas Jenkins, and successive owners expanded the estate. At Bulverton, generations of the same families continued to farm the land as tenants - the Gigg family at Bulverton Farm (now Bulverton House) while the Coles family occupied Bulverton Well Farm. In the early 1950s the two farms, together with other historic cottages in the hamlet, were put up for sale when the Manor estate was dispersed.

The view from Bulverton Hill is thought to have inspired 19th century poet and hymn writer John Keble who was a frequent visitor to Sidmouth. Keble's Seat at Bulverton Hill is named after him and commands a panoramic view of the Lower Otter Valley and Dartmoor in the distance.

== Railway ==
The former Sidmouth Railway station is nearby, with the embankment still visible in certain areas. A proposed cycle route involving Sustrans may use part of the embankment in the future to link outlying towns and villages to Sidmouth.

== Climate ==
The Met Office have a climate station at Sidmouth in the generality of Bulverton that records the comparatively mild United Kingdom climate.

Climate data for Sidmouth Station 1981–2010
Month	Jan	Feb	Mar	Apr	May	Jun	Jul	Aug	Sep	Oct	Nov	Dec	Year
Mean daily maximum °C (°F)	8.9 (48.0)	8.8 (47.8)	10.8 (51.4)	12.8 (55.0)	15.9 (60.6)	18.5 (65.3)	20.5 (68.9)	20.5 (68.9)	18.5 (65.3)	15.2 (59.4)	11.9 (53.4)	9.4 (48.9)	14.3 (57.7)
Mean daily minimum °C (°F)	3.3 (37.9)	2.9 (37.2)	4.3 (39.7)	5.3 (41.5)	8.5 (47.3)	11.1 (52.0)	13.2 (55.8)	13.1 (55.6)	11.1 (52.0)	8.8 (47.8)	5.8 (42.4)	3.7 (38.7)	7.6 (45.7)
Average precipitation mm (inches)	81.8 (3.22)	62.8 (2.47)	66.9 (2.63)	59.6 (2.35)	55.2 (2.17)	50.4 (1.98)	51.1 (2.01)	58.2 (2.29)	62.5 (2.46)	89.0 (3.50)	84.8 (3.34)	91.7 (3.61)	813.9 (32.04)
Mean monthly sunshine hours	67.7	84.6	119.1	168.6	191.0	197.4	213.7	198.1	145.2	110.2	81.9	60.1	1,637.7
Source: Met Office

== Gallery ==
Images of Bulverton

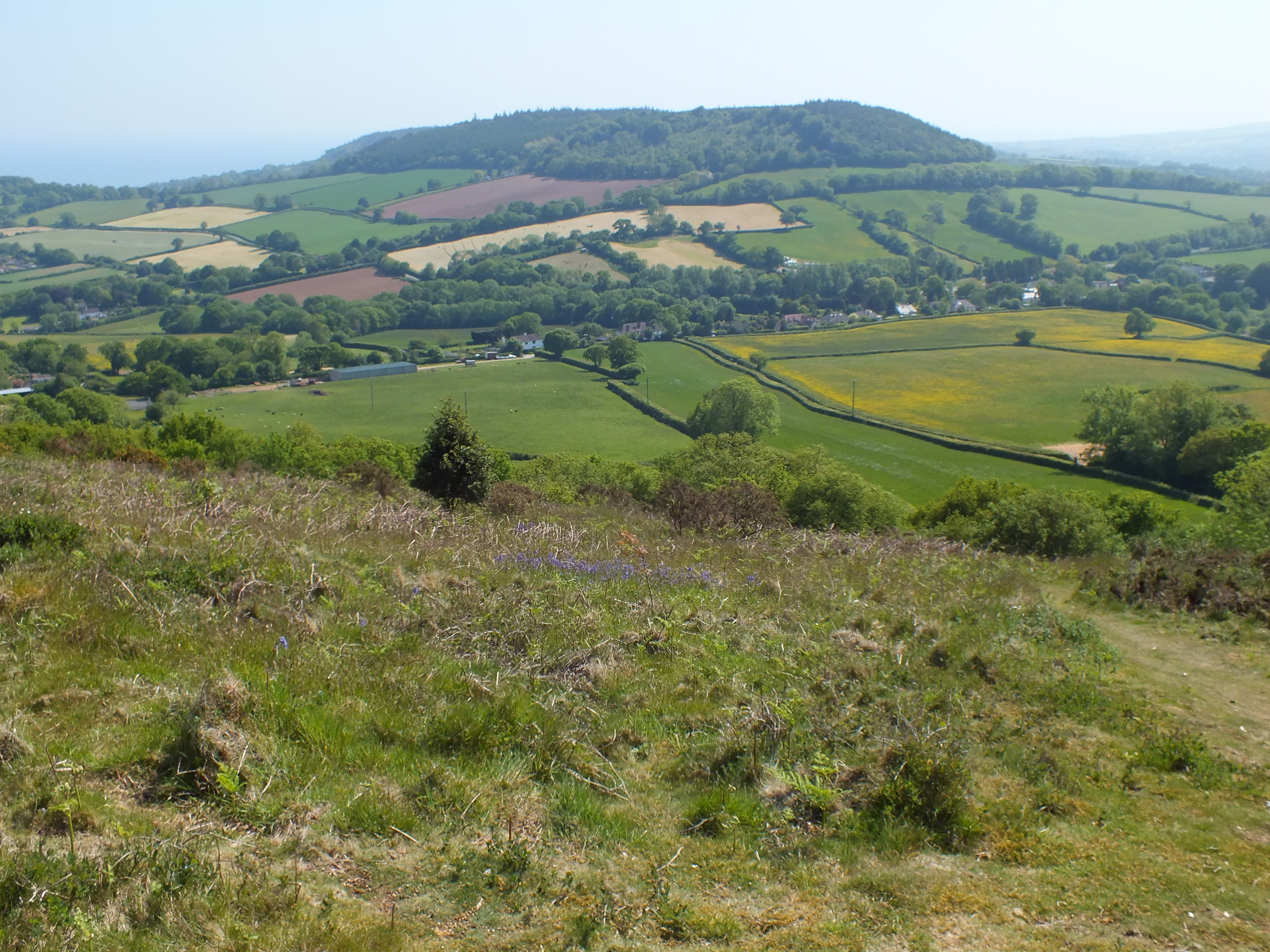
Bulverton Plantation as seen from Fire Beacon Hill.

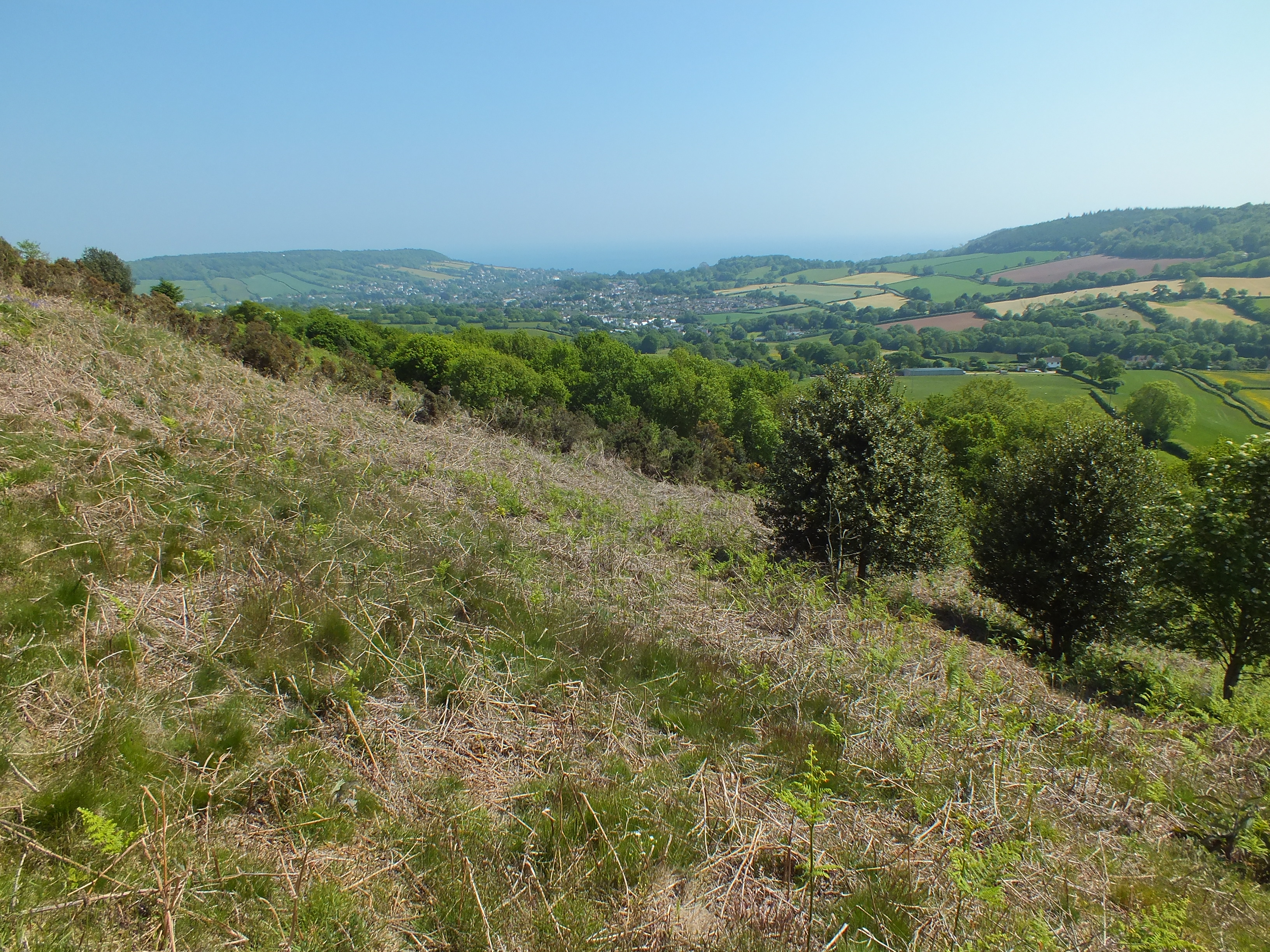
The land of Bulverton can be seen in the top right portion of the picture, taken from Fire Beacon Hill.

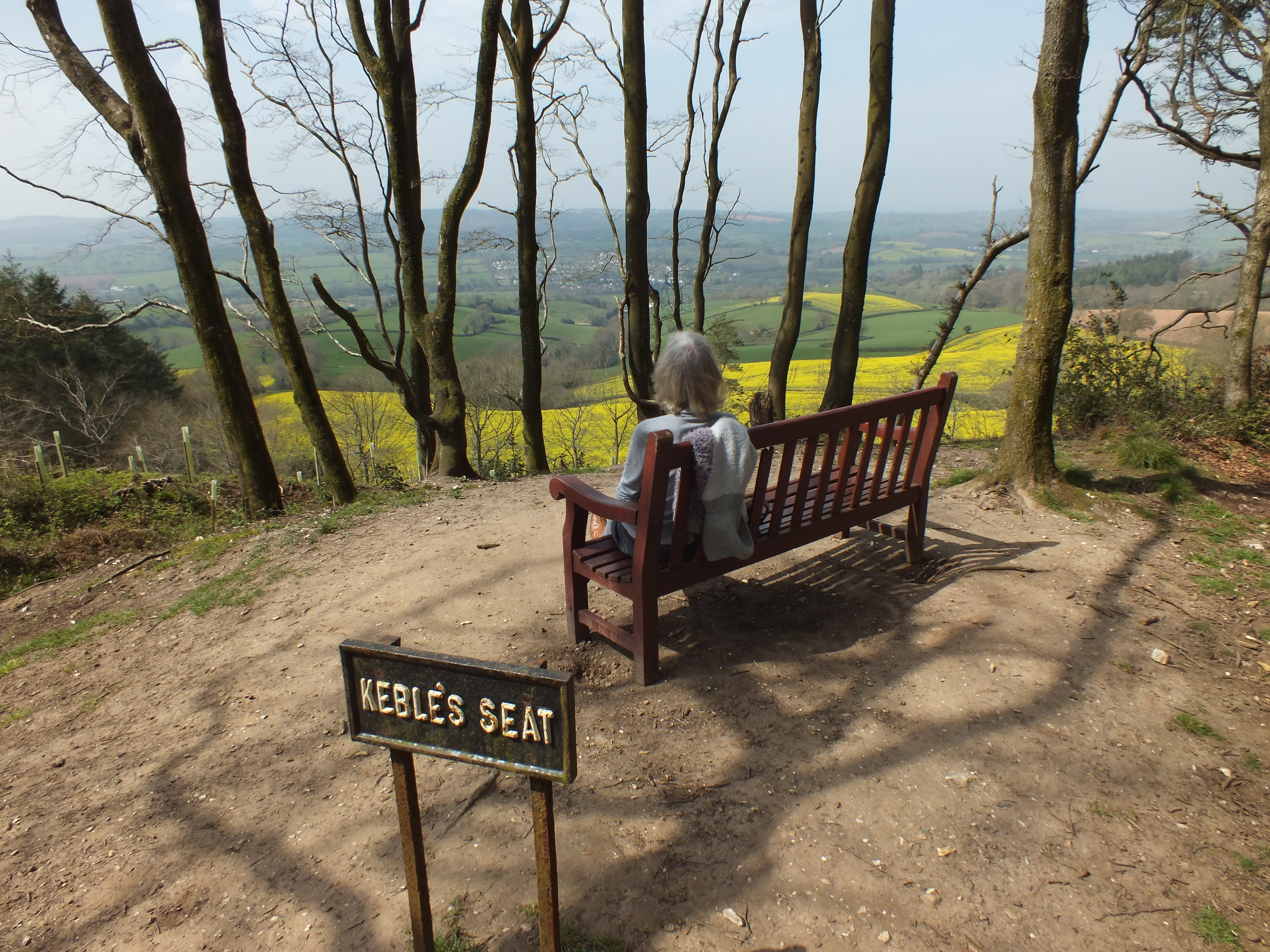
Keble's Seat at Bulverton Hill
