= John Jones (academic) =

Henry John Franklin Jones known as John Jones (6 May 1924 – 28 February 2016) was an English academic, a Fellow of Merton College, Oxford, and Oxford University's 38th Professor of Poetry (1978–1983). Jones wrote books on literary topics including Greek tragedy, Wordsworth, Shakespeare and a novel, The Same God (1972). He was a passionate football fan and a supporter of Plymouth Argyle, and spent three years (1956–1959) as football correspondent for The Observer.

Jones was married to the painter Jean Jones (née Robinson), with whom he had two children.

== Works ==
- 1954: The Egotistical Sublime: A History of Wordsworth's Imagination
- 1962: On Aristotle and Greek Tragedy
- 1962: Heathcote William Garrod 1878-1960
- 1963: H. W. Garrod's The Study of Good Letters (as editor)
- 1969: John Keats's Dream of Truth
- 1972: The Same God (novel)
- 1983: Dostoevsky
- 1995: Shakespeare at Work
- 1999: Fyodor Dostoevsky's Crime and Punishment
