= Joseph Warton =

18th-century English literary critic

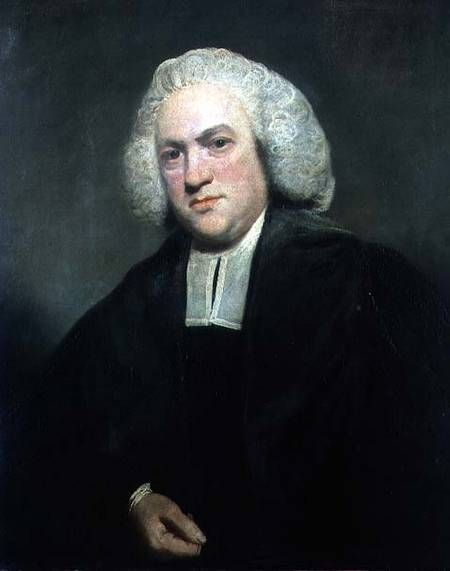
A 1777 portrait of Warton by Joshua Reynolds

Joseph Warton (April 1722 – 23 February 1800) was an English poet, clergyman, academic, and literary critic.

== Early life and education ==
Warton was born in Dunsfold, Surrey, England. His family later moved to Hampshire, where his father, the Reverend Thomas Warton, became vicar of Basingstoke. A few years later in Basingstoke, Joseph's sister Jane, also a writer, and his younger brother, Thomas Warton, were born. Their father later became a professor at the University of Oxford.

Joseph was educated at Winchester College and at Oriel College, Oxford.

== Career ==
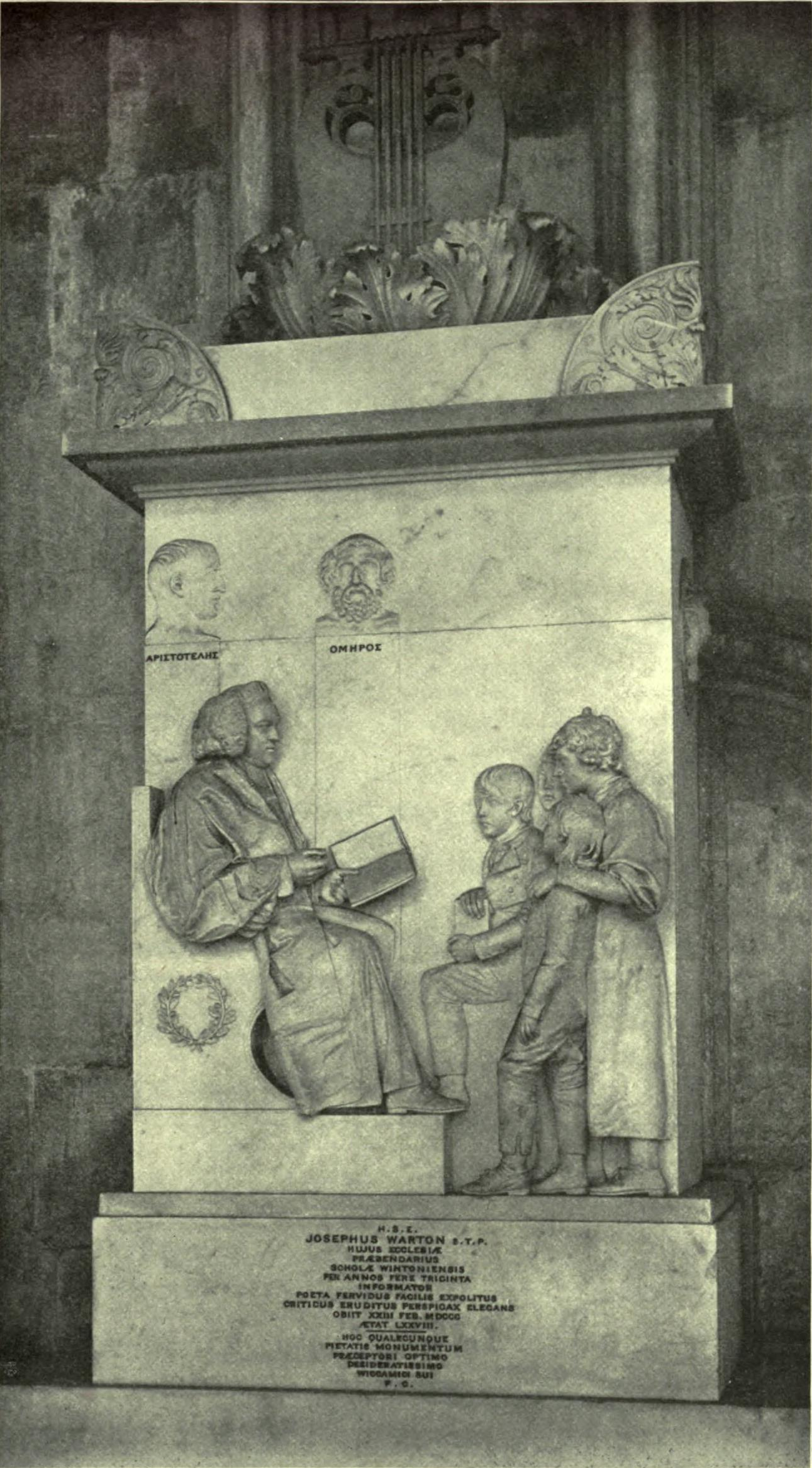
A monument to Warton by John Flaxman in Winchester Cathedral

In 1748, Warton followed his father into the church, becoming curate of Winslade. In 1754, he was instituted as rector at The Church of All Saints, Tunworth. In his early days Joseph wrote poetry, of which the most notable piece is The Enthusiast (1744), an early precursor of Romanticism.

In 1755, he returned to his old school to teach, and from 1766 to 1793 was its headmaster, presiding over a period of bad discipline and idleness, provoking three mutinies by the boys. His career as a critic was always more illustrious, and he produced editions of classical poets such as Virgil as well as English poets including John Dryden.

Like his brother, Warton was a friend of Samuel Johnson, and was part of the literary coterie centered around publisher Robert Dodsley.

A monument to Joseph Warton by the neoclassical sculptor John Flaxman is in Winchester Cathedral.

== Works ==
- The Enthusiast, or The Lover of Nature (1744)
- Odes on Various Subjects (1746)
- Essay on the Genius and Writings of Pope (volume 1: 1756; volume 2: 1782)
