= Thomas Warton =

18th-century English literary historian, critic, and poet

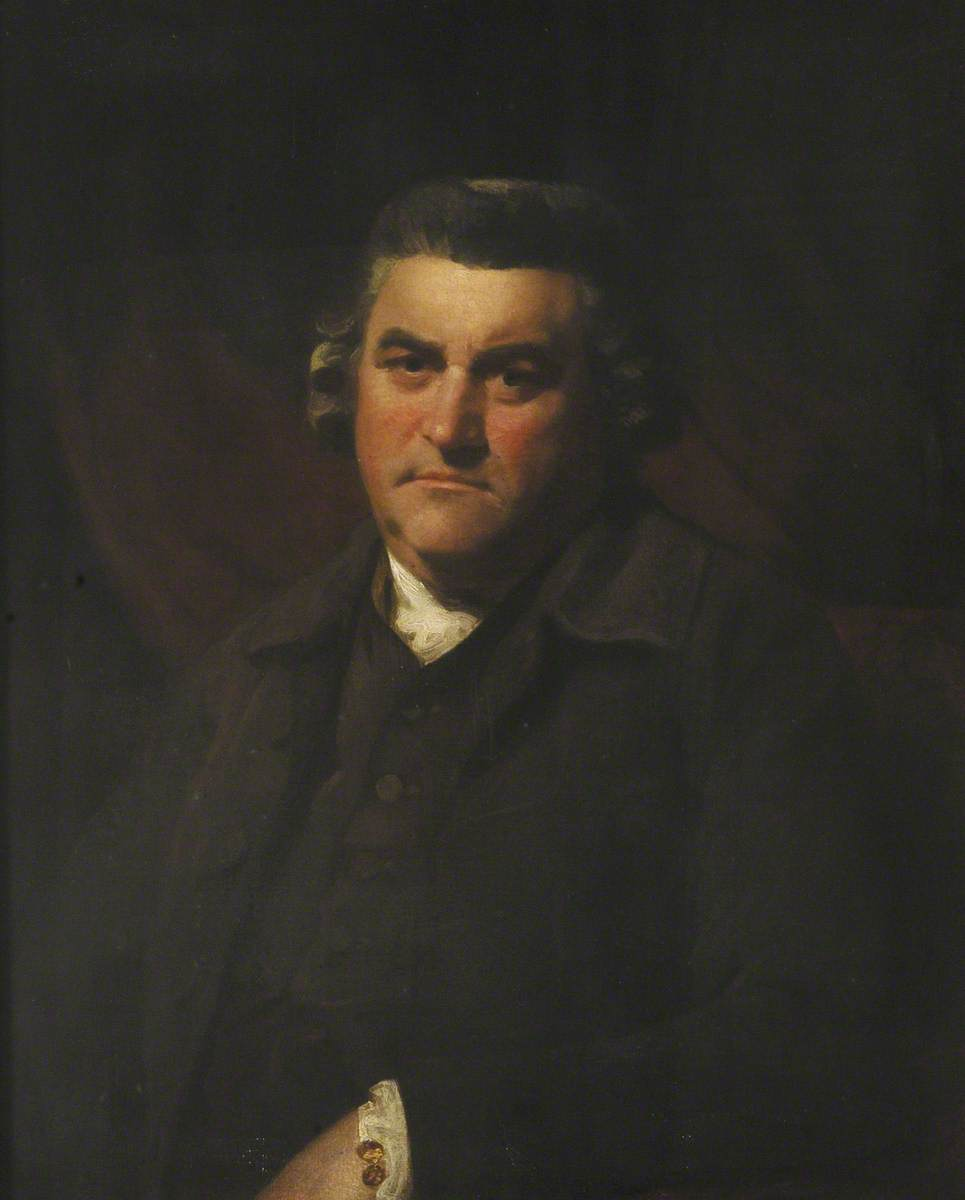
- Portrait by Sir Joshua Reynolds, 1784

Poet Laureate of the United Kingdom
- In office 20 April 1785 – 21 May 1790
- Monarch: George III
- Preceded by: William Whitehead
- Succeeded by: Henry James Pye

Personal details
- Born: 9 January 1728 Basingstoke, Hampshire, England
- Died: 21 May 1790 (aged 62) Oxford, England
- Parent: Thomas Warton (father)
- Education: Trinity College, Oxford
- Occupation: Literary historian, critic, and poet

Thomas Warton (9 January 1728 – 21 May 1790) was an English literary historian, critic, and poet. He was appointed Poet Laureate in 1785, following the death of William Whitehead.

He is sometimes called Thomas Warton the younger to distinguish him from his father, who had the same name. His most famous poem is The Pleasures of Melancholy, a representative work of the Graveyard Poets. He is also known for The History of English Poetry (1774–81), which is generally acknowledged to be the first narrative English literary history.

== Life ==
Warton was born in Basingstoke, Hampshire, the son of poet Thomas Warton, the Elder, and younger brother of Joseph Warton and Jane Warton. As a youngster, Warton demonstrated a strong predilection toward writing poetry, a skill he would continue to develop all of his life. In fact, Warton translated one of Martial's epigrams at nine and wrote The Pleasures of Melancholy at seventeen.

His early education was given to him by his father at home. In March 1744, aged 16, he entered Trinity College, Oxford. He graduated from Oxford in 1747, where he subsequently became a Fellow. Warton was selected as Poet Laureate of Oxford in 1747 and again in 1748. His duty in this post was to write a poem about a selected patroness of the university, which would be read to her on a specially appointed day.

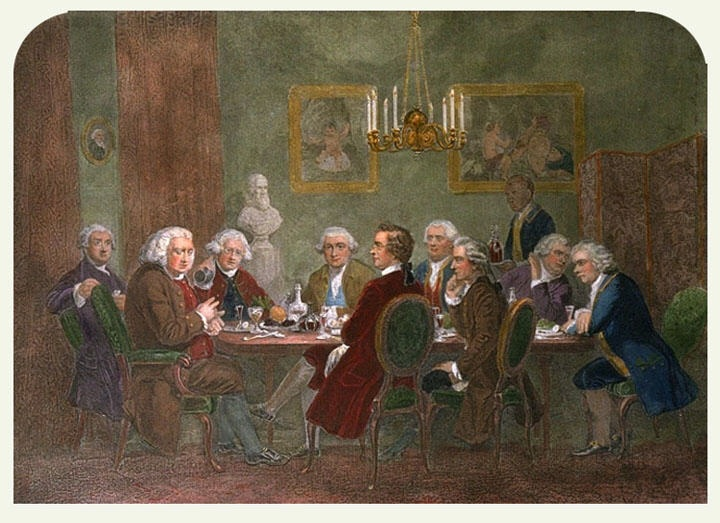
A literary party at Sir Joshua Reynolds's. Left to right: James Boswell, Samuel Johnson, Joshua Reynolds, David Garrick, Edmund Burke, Pasquale Paoli, Charles Burney, a servant (possibly Francis Barber), Thomas Warton, Oliver Goldsmith. (select a detail of the image for more information)

Warton was appointed Professor of Poetry at the university in 1757, a post that he held for ten years.

In 1771, he was appointed rector of Kiddington in Oxfordshire, a post he held until his death. In 1785, he was appointed Camden Professor of History, as well as the eighth Poet Laureate.

Among other important contributions, Warton, along with his brother, was among the first to argue that Sir Thopas, by Geoffrey Chaucer, was a parody. Warton contributed to the general project of the ballad revival. He was a general supporter of the poetry of Thomas Gray—a fact that Johnson satirized in his parody "Hermit hoar, in solemn cell." Among his minor works were an edition of Theocritus, a selection of Latin and Greek inscriptions, the humorous Oxford Companion to the Guide and Guide to the Companion (1762); lives of Sir Thomas Pope and Ralph Bathurst; and an Inquiry into the Authenticity of the Poems attributed to Thomas Rowley (1782).

Warton gave little attention to his clerical duties, and Oxford always remained his home. He was known as a very easy and convivial as well as a very learned don, with a taste for taverns and crowds as well as dim aisles and romances.

== Poetry, criticism and historical works ==
In a poem written in 1745 he shows the delight in Gothic churches and ruined castles which inspired much of his subsequent work in romantic revival. Most of Warton's poetry was written before the age of twenty-three, when he took his M.A. degree. In 1749, he penned The Triumph of Isis, a poem in praise of Oxford and the many students who had received their education there. Published anonymously, The Triumph of Isis rebutted William Mason's Isis, an Elegy published the previous year, which was anything but flattering to Oxford.

Following the success of The Triumph of Isis, Warton wrote Newmarket, a Satire, which was followed by a collection of verses. His complete poetical works were included in an anthology that was published in 1853.

Although he continued to write poetry, Warton's main energies were turned to poetical reading and criticism. His first major academic work was Observations on the Faerie Queene of Spenser, published in 1754. He is, however, best known for the three-volume The History of English Poetry (1774–81), which covered the poetry of the 11th through the 16th centuries. Although the work was criticised for its many inaccuracies, it is nonetheless considered a highly important and influential historical tome.

In 1782, he wrote The History and Antiquities of Kiddington, an early example of English local history.

== Various works ==
- The Pleasures of Melancholy.
- Observations on the Faerie Queene of Spenser. 1754.
- The Oxford Sausage. 1764. – an anthology of verse and Oxford wit
- Inquiry into the Authenticity of the Rowley Poems. 1770.
- History of English Poetry. 1774–1781.
- The History and Antiquities of Kiddington. 1782.

== Warton Lectures ==
In 1910, Frida Mond endowed the British Academy with a fund to establish an annual Shakespeare oration or lecture, as well as an annual lecture on English poetry to be called the Warton Lecture, as a tribute to the memory of Thomas Warton as a historian of English poetry. The inaugural lectures in these series were delivered in 1911 and 1910, respectively.

Court offices
Preceded by William Whitehead	British Poet Laureate; 1785–1790	Succeeded by Henry James Pye
