= The History of English Poetry =

Book by Thomas Warton

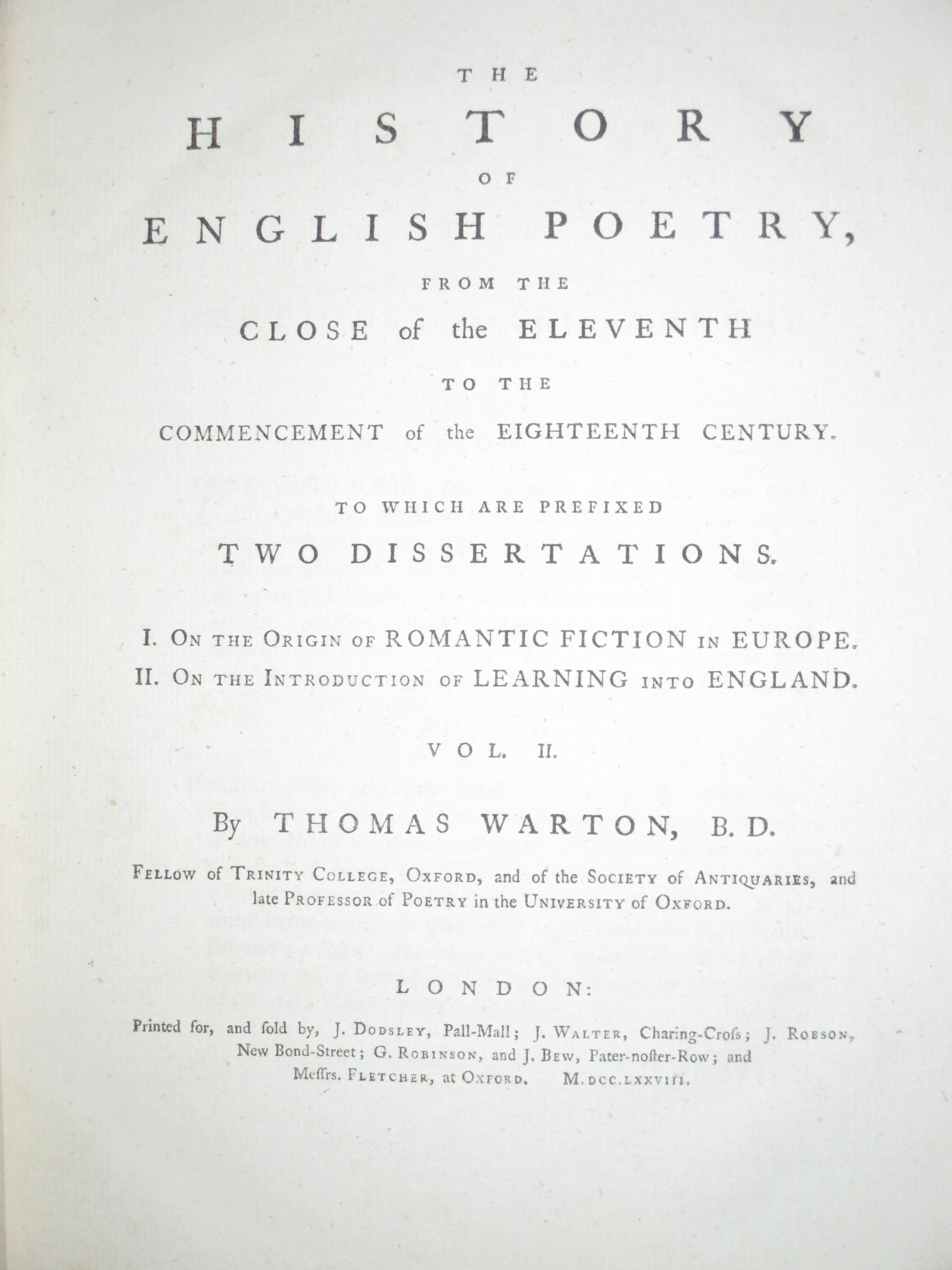
Title page of the first edition of volume 2

The History of English Poetry, from the Close of the Eleventh to the Commencement of the Eighteenth Century (1774-1781) by Thomas Warton was a pioneering and influential literary history. Only three full volumes were ever published, going as far as Queen Elizabeth's reign, but their account of English poetry in the Late Middle Ages and Renaissance was unrivalled for many years, and played a part in steering British literary taste towards Romanticism. It is generally acknowledged to be the first narrative English literary history.

== Composition and content ==
Warton probably began researching the History in the 1750s, but did not actually begin writing in earnest until 1769. He conceived of his work as tracing "the transitions from barbarism to civility" in English poetry, but alongside this view of progress went a Romantic love of medieval poetry for its own sake. The first volume, published in 1774 with a second edition the following year, is prefaced with two dissertations: one on "The Origin of Romantic Fiction in Europe", which he believed to lie in the Islamic world, and the other on "The Introduction of Learning into England", which deals with the revival of interest in Classical literature. Then begins the History proper. Warton decided to give no account of Anglo-Saxon poetry, ostensibly because it lay before "that era, when our national character began to dawn", though doubtless really because his knowledge of the language was too slight to serve him. Instead he began with the impact of the Norman Conquest on the English language, before moving on to the vernacular chronicles. Then follow a series of studies of various Middle English romances, of Piers Plowman, and of Early Scots historical writing. The volume ends with a long and detailed look at the works of Geoffrey Chaucer. The second volume appeared in 1778. It deals with John Gower, Thomas Hoccleve, John Lydgate, and the controversy over the authenticity of Thomas Rowley's poems (actually forgeries by Thomas Chatterton, as Warton shows), before moving on to Stephen Hawes and other poets of the reigns of Henry VII. He studies the Scottish Chaucerians in some detail, then returns to England and John Skelton. The volume ends with chapters on the mystery plays, and on continental humanism and the Reformation. The third volume, published in 1781, begins with a dissertation on the Gesta Romanorum, one of many sections of the History to fall out of chronological sequence. He moves on to the Earl of Surrey, Thomas Wyatt, Tottel's Miscellany, John Heywood, Thomas More, and another out-of-sequence study, this time of the Middle English romance of Ywain and Gawain. Then come The Mirror for Magistrates, Thomas Sackville, Richard Edwardes, and finally a general survey of Elizabethan poetry. His fourth volume was never published complete, though 88 pages of it were printed in 1789. It is often said that attacks on the History by the antiquary Joseph Ritson were the cause of Warton's publishing no more, but other theories have been suggested: that he found the wide variety of 16th century literature difficult to bring within a simple narrative structure; that he found himself unable to reconcile his Romantic and Classical attitudes towards early poetry; that the further he left his greatest love, the era of romance, behind him the less interested he became; that an alternative project of editing Milton had captured his interest; or that he was just congenitally lazy.

== Later editions ==
As the state of medievalist scholarship advanced the need for revision in Warton's History became increasingly felt. In 1824 a new and expanded edition of the History was published, with additional notes by, among others, Joseph Ritson, George Ashby, Francis Douce, Thomas Park, and the editor, Richard Price. The 1840 edition, by Richard Taylor, contained further notes by Frederic Madden, Thomas Wright, Richard Garnett, Benjamin Thorpe, J. M. Kemble and others. Finally, William Carew Hazlitt edited the History afresh in 1871. The contributors to this version included Frederic Madden, Thomas Wright, Walter Skeat, Richard Morris and Frederick Furnivall.

== Critical reception and influence ==
Warton's History had all the advantages and disadvantages of a pioneering work. Being almost the first work to give general readers any information on Middle English poetry it had the attraction of novelty, leading to a generally favourable response to the first edition. The Gentleman's Magazine, reviewing the first volume, called it "this capital historical piece", and had no doubt that "every connoisseur will be curious to view the original, and impatient for the completion of it". Of the third volume the same magazine wrote that it "does equal credit to Mr. Warton's taste, judgment, and erudition, and makes us impatiently desirous of more". Edward Gibbon mentioned the History in The Decline and Fall of the Roman Empire, saying it had been accomplished "with the taste of a poet and the minute diligence of an antiquarian". But the praise was not unanimous. Horace Walpole and William Mason both professed themselves annoyed by Warton's habit of throwing in illustrative material indiscriminately. A more dangerous attack came from Joseph Ritson, whose pamphlet Observations on the Three First Volumes of the History of English Poetry, bitterly tore into Warton for the many mistranscriptions, misinterpretations, and errors of fact that his book, as the very first attempt to map the Middle English world, inevitably contained. This led to a long and sometimes ill-tempered correspondence in the journals between Warton, Ritson, and their respective supporters. Ritson kept up the attack in successive books through the rest of his life, culminating in the viciously personal "Dissertation on Romance and Minstrelsy" in 1802.

By the time the dust had settled from this controversy everyone was aware that the History could not be implicitly trusted, but it continued to be loved by a new generation whose taste for the older English poetry Warton's book, along with Percy's Reliques, had formed. The influence of those two books on the growth of the Romantic spirit can be illustrated by Robert Southey, who wrote that they had confirmed in him a love of Middle English that had been formed by his discovery of Chaucer; and by Walter Scott's description of the History as "an immense commonplace book…from the perusal of which we rise, our fancy delighted with beautiful imagery and with the happy analysis of ancient tale and song".

In 1899 Sidney Lee wrote in the Dictionary of National Biography that:

Even the mediæval expert of the present day, who finds that much of Warton's information is superannuated and that many of his generalisations have been disproved by later discoveries, realises that nowhere else has he at his command so well furnished an armoury of facts and dates about obscure writers.

The 1911 Encyclopædia Britannica confirmed that "his book is still indispensable to the student of English poetry". Though Warton's History no longer enjoys the same position as an authority on early poetry, it is still appreciated. Arthur Johnston wrote that

To the modern scholar reading Warton, it is not his errors in transcripts or dating which attract attention; it is rather the richness of his information, the wealth of documentation, the multitude of his discoveries, his constant alertness to the problems and awareness of the ramifications of his subject.
