= Professor of Poetry =

Academic appointment at the University of Oxford

The Professor of Poetry is an academic appointment at the University of Oxford. The chair was created in 1708 by an endowment from the estate of Henry Birkhead. The professorship carries an obligation to deliver an inaugural lecture; give one public lecture each term on a suitable literary subject; offer one additional event each term (which may include poetry readings, workshops, hosted events, etc.); deliver the Creweian Oration at Encaenia every other year; each year, to be one of the judges for the Newdigate Prize, the Jon Stallworthy Prize, the Lord Alfred Douglas Prize and the Chancellor's English Essay Prize; every third year, to help judge the English poem on a sacred subject prize; and generally to encourage the art of poetry in the University.

The professor is appointed to a single four-year term. The Professor of Poetry Committee produces a shortlist of applicants to stand for election by members of the University of Oxford's Convocation. Convocation consists of members of the faculty (Congregation) both current and retired, and former student members of the university who have been admitted to a degree (other than an honorary degree). In 2010, on-line voting was allowed for the first time. The Professor of Poetry receives a stipend (£25,000 per annum as of 2023) which is increased in line with the annual cost-of-living increases for academic and related staff, plus £40 for each Creweian Oration.

Since 1708, 47 persons have been elected to the position including many prominent poets and academics. Alice Oswald, who was Professor of Poetry from 2019 to 2023, was the first woman to hold this post, although not the first woman elected to it, which was Ruth Padel, who resigned after nine days without fulfilling the obligations of the post. She was succeeded in 2023 by A. E. Stallings.

The elections typically attract media attention and involve campaigning by proponents of quite diverse candidates. In the past, both practising poets and academic critics have been chosen.

== 2009 election ==
On 16 May 2009, Ruth Padel defeated the Indian poet Arvind Mehrotra to become the first woman elected to the post since its inception in 1708. The Nobel Prize-winning candidate Derek Walcott had withdrawn his candidacy, following what he called a "low and degrading" campaign against him, after The Sunday Times and Cherwell revealed that around 100 Oxford academics had been sent, anonymously, photocopied pages from The Lecherous Professor, a University of Illinois publication on the prevalence of sexual harassment in American universities, describing two such accusations made against Walcott at Harvard University and Boston University. Walcott's candidacy had been controversial within the university from the beginning, some counselling against on grounds of Walcott's university past, others arguing that his record was immaterial since he would have no contact with students. Newspapers had previously claimed Walcott was the favourite, although Libby Purves suggested that this claim was based on a misunderstanding of the electoral system. Padel criticised the anonymous missives and denied any knowledge of them, though many in the media continued to insinuate her involvement. After her election, two journalists who had previously requested information from Padel regarding voters' opinions revealed that she had cited to them the source of some people's unease about the suitability for appointment of someone with such a university record. Padel stated, "I wish he had not pulled out", and resigned on 25 May only nine days after her election.

Letters to British newspapers criticised media handling of the election. An open letter to the Times Literary Supplement complained of unfair media pursuit of Walcott's past, a letter in The Guardian complained of unjust denigration of Padel, claiming she was "justly held in high regard" for her poetry and teaching, and a letter to The Times claimed that "Oxford has missed out for the worst of reasons". "One can only speculate why so many male voices were loud in condemning Padel but silent with respect to Walcott. I attended a course taught by Ruth Padel: she was inspirational, involved, enthusiastic and interested in her students. Perhaps it was unwise of her to email journalists but if Walcott's past is 'irrelevant to his suitability to fill the post of Professor of Poetry', so is Padel's 'unwisdom'. That Walcott removed the decision from the electorate was his own choice. Padel should not have been made to pay for his decision to confront neither his accusers nor his past." American commentators attributed the series of events to an assumption on the part of academics and writers that a gender war was behind it all, perceiving a "split across the Atlantic - with the Americans, the ones after all working with Walcott over the decades, taking those claims much more seriously"

Some commentators in Britain supported Padel, attributing the smear campaign in the media to misogyny and networking. "The old boys have closed in on her," the poet Jackie Kay stated. On Newsnight Review the poet Simon Armitage and poetry writer Josephine Hart expressed regret about Padel's resignation. "Ruth's a good person," Armitage said. "She dipped a toe in the media whirlpool and it dragged her down. I don't think she should have resigned; she would have been good." The election was for a post beginning the first day of Michaelmas Term 2009, hence Padel did not take up office. In the 2010 election she supported Geoffrey Hill.

== 2010 election ==
On 7 May 2010, the university, having changed its system of voting to embrace online voters, confirmed that Paula Claire, Geoffrey Hill, Michael Horovitz, Steve Larkin, Chris Mann and seven others had been nominated as candidates for the position.

Paula Claire, the only woman standing, announced her withdrawal on 7 June 2010, citing concerns about the fairness of the election, which were dismissed by the university authorities.

On 18 June, Geoffrey Hill was declared elected. He received 1,156 votes; the next highest number, 353, went to Michael Horovitz.

== 2015 election ==
On 19 June 2015, Simon Armitage was elected as Geoffrey Hill's successor.

== Persons elected to the position (1708–present) ==
#	Portrait	Professor of Poetry	Took office	Left office	Career	Notes
1		Joseph Trapp (1679–1747)	1708	1718	English High Church Anglican clergyman, academic, poet (occasional verse), dramatist, and pamphleteer, described as "fond of reciting the works of Shakespeare in Latin"	
2	—	Thomas Warton the Elder (c. 1688–1745)	1718	1726	English clergyman and later schoolmaster of the Winchester School; poet of occasional verse, appointed owing to his Jacobite sympathies	
3		Joseph Spence (1699–1768)	1728	1738	English historian, literary scholar, anecdotist, and travelling companion; fellow at New College, Oxford, Regius Professor of Modern History, prebendary of Durham Cathedral	
4	—	John Whitfield	1738	1741	Anglican clergyman, tutor of Christ Church, Oxford	
5		Robert Lowth (1710–1787)	1741	1751	Author of an influential textbook on English grammar, poet, and Anglican clergyman; appointed Bishop of Oxford and Bishop of London, dean of the chapel royal and privy counsellor; declined to become Archbishop of Canterbury in 1783 owing to failing health	
6	—	William Hawkins (1722–1801)	1751	1756	English clergyman, author of sermons, poet and dramatist	
7		Thomas Warton the Younger (1728–1790)	1757	1766	English literary historian, critic, and poet; Camden Professor of Ancient History at the University of Oxford and Poet Laureate of England (1785–1790); wrote three-volume history of English poetry (1774, 1778, 1781), interested in primitivism and in the ballad revival; his well-known poem The Pleasures of Melancholy is a representative work of the Graveyard poets	
8	—	Benjamin Wheeler	1766	1776	Fellow of Magdalen College, Oxford, Regius Professor of Divinity and canon of Christ Church, Oxford	
9		John Randolph (1749–1813)	1776	1783	British scholar, teacher, and Anglican clergyman who rose to become Bishop of Oxford (1799–1807), Bishop of Bangor (1807–1809), Bishop of London (1809–1813); Regius Professor of Greek (1782–1783) and Regius Professor of Divinity (1783–1807)	
10	—	Robert Holmes (1748–1805)	1783	1793	English clergyman, Dean of Winchester, and biblical scholar known for textual studies of the Septuagint	
11		James Hurdis (1763–1801)	1793	1801	English clergyman and a poet, headmaster of Prebendal School, Chichester	
12		Edward Copleston (1776–1849)	1802	1812	English clergyman and academic, Provost of Oriel College, Oxford (1814–1828), Bishop of Llandaff (1827–1849)	
13	—	John Josias Conybeare (1779–1824)	1812	1821	English clergyman, geologist; appointed Rawlinsonian Professor of Anglo-Saxon (1808–1812), known for translations of Beowulf in English and Latin verse (1814), posthumously published Illustrations of Anglo-Saxon Poetry (1826)	
14		Henry Hart Milman (1791–1868)	1821	1831	English historian, dramatist, and clergyman, fellow of Brasenose College, Oxford recipient of the Newdigate Prize (1812), English essay prize for Comparative Estimate of Sculpture and Painting (1816); appointed Dean of St Paul's; authored lyrics for Palm Sunday hymn Ride on, ride on, in majesty!	
15		John Keble (1792–1866)	1831	1841	English clergyman and poet, appointed owing to the popularity of The Christian Year (1827), one of the leaders of the Oxford Movement (Anglo-Catholic revival); Keble College, Oxford named in his honour	
16	—	James Garbett (1802–1879)	1842	1852	British academic and evangelical Anglican clergyman, later Archdeacon of Chichester (1851–1879); Fellow of Brasenose College, Oxford; an opponent to the Oxford Movement reforms, Garbett did not have sufficient credentials in poetry and was appointed owing to his anti-Tractarian stance through the efforts of Brasenose principal, Ashurst Turner Gilbert	
17		Thomas Legh Claughton (1808–1892)	1852	1857	British academic, poet and Anglican clergyman; recipient of the Newdigate Prize (1829); Bishop of Rochester (1867–1877) and the first Bishop of St Albans (1877–1890)	
18		Matthew Arnold (1822–1888)	1857	1867	British poet, school inspector, educator and cultural critic; recipient of Newdigate Prize (1843) for poem Cromwell; Fellow of Oriel College, Oxford; godson of John Keble	
19		Francis Hastings Doyle (1810–1888)	1867	1877	British poet, attorney, and civil servant	
20		John Campbell Shairp (1819–1885)	1877	1885	Scottish critic and scholar; master at Rugby School, humanities professor at University of St Andrews, principal of United College, St Andrews	
21		Francis Turner Palgrave (1824–1897)	1885	1895	British critic and poet.	
22	—	William Courthope (1824–1917)	1895	1901	English writer and historian of poetry; recipient of the Newdigate Prize (1864) and Chancellors English essay prize (1868)	
23		A. C. Bradley (1851–1935)	1901	1906	English literary scholar, fellow at Balliol College, Oxford, professor at University of Liverpool and University of Glasgow, known for his Shakespearean scholarship, especially Shakespearean Tragedy (1904)	
24		John William Mackail (1859–1945)	1906	1911	Scottish literary scholar, biographer, historian poet, known for scholarship and translations of Virgil; civil servant with Ministry of Education (1884–1919); President of the British Academy (1932–1936)	
25		Thomas Herbert Warren (1853–1930)	1911	1916	English academic and college administrator; fellow of Balliol College, Oxford, President of Magdalen College, Oxford (1885–1928), Vice-Chancellor of Oxford University (1906–1910)	
—	—	Vacant	1916	1920	—	—
26		William Paton Ker (1855–1923)	1920	1923	Scottish literary scholar and essayist; fellow, All Souls College, Oxford; English literature and history professor, University College of South Wales, Cardiff; Quain Professor, University College London	
27	—	Heathcote William Garrod (1878-1960)	1923	1928	British classical scholar and literary scholar; fellow of Merton College, Oxford, Charles Eliot Norton Professor of Poetry at Harvard University (1929–1930)	
28	—	Ernest de Sélincourt (1870–1943)	1928	1933	British literary scholar and critic; fellow of University College, Oxford, professor at University of Birmingham; editor of works of William Wordsworth and Dorothy Wordsworth	
29	—	George Stuart Gordon (1881–1942)	1933	1938	British literary scholar, English literature professor at University of Leeds, and Oxford, President of Magdalen College, Oxford, and Vice-Chancellor	
30	—	Adam Fox (1883–1977)	1938	1943	English poet and canon, author of long poem Old King Coel, one of the first members of the "Inklings", Dean of Divinity at Magdalen College, Oxford, Warden of Radley College, Canon of Westminster Abbey	
—	—	Vacant	1944	1946	—	—
31	—	Maurice Bowra (1898–1971)	1946	1951	English classical scholar and academic, Warden of Wadham College, Oxford (1938–1970), Vice-Chancellor of the University of Oxford (1951–1954)	
32		Cecil Day-Lewis (1904–1972)	1951	1956	Anglo-Irish poet and mystery writer, Poet Laureate of the United Kingdom (1968–1972)	
33		W. H. Auden (1907–1973)	1956	1961	prolific Anglo-American poet and essayist, regarded by many critics as one of the greatest writers of the twentieth century	
34		Robert Graves (1895–1985)	1961	1966	English poet, novelist, classical scholar and translator; author of over 140 works	
35		Edmund Blunden (1896–1974)	1966	1968	English poet, author and critic	
36	-	Roy Fuller (1912–1991)	1968	1973	English poet and novelist	
37	—	John Wain (1925–1994)	1973	1978	English poet, novelist, critic, freelance newspaper and radio journalist; associated with the literary group "The Movement"; taught at University of Reading, Gresham College, London, and Brasenose College, Oxford	
38	—	John Jones (1924–2016)	1978	1983	Fellow at Merton College, Oxford, later emeritus; written books on diverse literary topics including Greek tragedy, Wordsworth, Shakespeare, Dostoyevsky, Keats, and one novel	
39	-	Peter Levi (1931–2000)	1984	1989	English-born poet, archaeologist, Jesuit priest, travel writer, biographer, academic and prolific reviewer and critic	
40		Seamus Heaney (1939–2013)	1989	1994	Irish poet, playwright, translator and lecturer at Queen's University Belfast and Harvard University, recipient of Nobel Prize in Literature (1995) and many other honours	
41	—	James Fenton (born 1949)	1994	1999	English poet, journalist and literary critic, recipient of Newdigate Prize for sonnet sequence Our Western Furniture	
42		Paul Muldoon (born 1951)	1999	2004	Irish poet, author of over 30 collections of poetry, professor at Princeton University, recipient of the Pulitzer Prize for Poetry (2003) and the T. S. Eliot Prize (1994)	
43	—	Christopher Ricks (born 1933)	2004	2009	British literary critic and scholar, professor at Boston University, co-director of the university's Editorial Institute	
—		Ruth Padel (born 1946)	—	—	British poet and non-fiction writer; taught Greek at Wadham College, Oxford, Birkbeck, University of London and Princeton University; elected to the chair in May 2009, she would have been the first female poet appointed. Padel resigned nine days after the election, without filling the position, owing to allegations of her role in the scandal surrounding poet Derek Walcott who earlier withdrew from the election.	
44	-	Geoffrey Hill (1932–2016)	2010	2015	English poet, English literature and religion professor at Emmanuel College, Cambridge and Boston University, co-founder of BU's Editorial Institute	
45		Simon Armitage (born 1963)	2015	2019	English poet, playwright and novelist. Professor of poetry at the University of Sheffield, and the University of Leeds. Poet Laureate of the United Kingdom 2019-	
46		Alice Oswald (born 1966)	2019	2023	Won the T. S. Eliot Prize in 2012 and the 2017 Griffin Poetry Prize. First female appointee.	
47	-	A. E. Stallings (born 1968)	2023	-	American poet, translator, and essayist. Won Guggenheim Fellowship and MacArthur Foundation Fellowship, shortlisted for the Pulitzer Prize.	
